This list of suffragists and suffragettes includes noted individuals active in the worldwide women's suffrage movement who have campaigned or strongly advocated for women's suffrage, the organisations which they formed or joined, and the publications which publicized – and, in some nations, continue to publicize – their goals. Suffragists and suffragettes, often members of different groups and societies, used or use differing tactics. "Suffragette" in the British usage denotes a more "militant" type of campaigner, while suffragettes in the United States organized such nonviolent events as the Suffrage Hikes, the Woman Suffrage Procession of 1913, and the Silent Sentinels.

Argentina
Cecilia Grierson (1859–1934) – the first woman physician in Argentina; supporter of women's emancipation, including suffrage
Julieta Lanteri (1873–1932) – physician, freethinker, and activist; the first woman to vote in Argentina
Alicia Moreau de Justo (1885–1986) – physician, politician, pacifist and human rights activist
Eva Perón (1919–1952) – First Lady of Argentina, created the first large female political party in the nation
Elvira Rawson de Dellepiane (1867–1954) – physician, activist for women's and children's rights; co-founder of the Association Pro-Derechos de la Mujer

Australia

Maybanke Anderson (1845–1927) – promoter of women's and children's rights, campaigner for women's suffrage and federation
Eliza Ashton (1851/1852–1900) – journalist and founding member of the Womanhood Suffrage League of New South Wales
Annette Bear-Crawford (1853–1899) – women's suffragist and federationist in Victoria
Rosetta Jane Birks (1856–1911) – social reformer, philanthropist and South Australian women's suffragist
Dora Meeson Coates (1869–1955) – artist, member of British Artists' Suffrage League
Mary Colton (1822–1898) – president of the Women's Suffrage League from 1892 to 1895
Edith Cowan (1861–1932) – politician, social campaigner, first woman elected to an Australian parliament 
Henrietta Dugdale (1827–1918) – initiated the first female suffrage society in Australia
Kate Dwyer (1861–1949) – schoolteacher and Labor leader, member of the Womanhood Suffrage League of New South Wales
Fanny Furner (1864–1938) – activist, first women to stand for election in local government in Manly
Belle Theresa Golding (1864–1940) – feminist, suffragist and labor activist
Vida Goldstein (1869–1949) – feminist politician, first woman in British Empire to stand for election to a national parliament
Serena Lake (1842–1902) – South Australian evangelical preacher, social reformer, campaigner for women's suffrage
Louisa Lawson (1848–1920) – poet, writer, publisher, and feminist
Mary Lee (1821–1909) – suffragist and social reformer in South Australia
Muriel Matters (1877–1969) – lecturer, journalist, educator, actress, elocutionist, member of the Women's Freedom League
May Jordan McConnel (1860–1929) – trade unionist and suffragist, member of the Women's Equal Franchise Association
Emma Miller (1839–1917) – pioneer trade union organiser, co-founder of the Women's Equal Franchise Association
Elizabeth Webb Nicholls (1850–1943) – campaigner for women's suffrage in South Australia
Jessie Rooke (1845–1906) – Tasmanian suffragist and temperance reformer
Rose Scott (1847–1925) – founder of the Women's Political Education League
Catherine Helen Spence (1825–1910) – author, teacher, and journalist; commemorated on a special issue of the Australian five-dollar note
Jessie Street (1889–1970) – feminist, human rights campaigner
Mary Hynes Swanton (1861–1940) Australian women's rights and trade unionist
Mary Windeyer (1836–1912) – women's suffrage campaigner in New South Wales

Austria
Marianne Hainisch (1839–1936) – founder and leader of the Austrian women's movement, mother of first President of Austria 
Ernestine von Fürth, (1877–1946) – co-founder of the New Viennese Women's Club, chairwoman of the Austrian Women's Suffrage Committee
Friederike Mekler von Traunweis Zeileis (née Mautner von Markhof, 1872–1954) – founding member of the IWSA
Rosa Welt-Straus (1856–1938) – first Austrian woman to earn a medical degree; representative to the International Woman Suffrage Alliance

Bahamas
Mary Ingraham (1901–1982) – co-founder and president of the Bahamas Women's Suffrage Movement
Georgianna Kathleen Symonette (1902–1965) – co-founder of the Women's Suffrage Movement
Mabel Walker (suffragist) (1902–1987) – co-founder of the Women's Suffrage Movement

Barbados
Nellie Weekes (1896–1990) – campaigner for women's involvement in politics, who ran for office in 1942, before women were allowed to vote in the country

Belgium
Jane Brigode (1870–1952) – politician, member of the International Woman Suffrage Alliance
Léonie de Waha (1836–1926) – Belgian feminist, philanthropist, educator and Walloon activist
Isabelle Gatti de Gamond (1839–1905) – Belgian educator, feminist, suffragist and politician
Marie Parent (1853–1934) – journal editor, temperance activist, feminist and suffragist
Marie Popelin (1846–1913) – lawyer and early feminist political campaigner; worked for universal adult suffrage
Louise van den Plas (1877–1968) – suffragist and founder of the first Christian feminist movement in Belgium

Brazil
Leolinda de Figueiredo Daltro (1859–1935) – teacher and indigenous' rights activist; co-founder of the Feminine Republican Party
Celina Guimarães Viana (1890–1972) – Brazilian professor and suffragist; first woman to vote in Brazil
Ivone Guimarães (1908–1999) –  Brazilian professor and activist for women's suffrage
Jerônima Mesquita (1880–1972) – co-founder of the Federação Brasileira pelo Progresso Feminino
Carlota Pereira de Queirós (1892–1982) – the first woman to vote and be elected to the Brazilian parliament
Marie Rennotte (1852–1942) – Native Belgian, naturalized Brazilian teacher and lawyer who founded the Aliança Paulista pelo Sufrágio Feminino with Carrie Chapman Catt's help
Miêtta Santiago (1903–1995) – Brazilian writer, poet, and lawyer; challenged the constitutionality of the ban on women voting in Brazil

Maria Werneck de Castro (1909–1993) – lawyer, militant communist, feminist, and supporter of women's suffrage

Bulgaria
 Zheni Bozhilova-Pateva (1878–1955) – teacher, writer, and one of the most active women's rights activists of her era
 Dimitrana Ivanova (1881–1960) – reform pedagogue, women's rights activist
 Julia Malinova (1869–1953) – women's rights activist

Canada

Edith Archibald (1854–1936) – writer who led the Maritime Women's Christian Temperance Union and the National Council of Women of Canada and the Local Council of Women of Halifax
Francis Marion Beynon (1884–1951) – Canadian journalist, feminist and pacifist
Laura Borden (1861–1940) – wife of Sir Robert Laird Borden, the eighth Prime Minister of Canada
Henrietta Muir Edwards (1849–1931) – women's rights activist and reformer
Helena Gutteridge (1879–1960) – first woman elected to city council in Vancouver
Gertrude Harding (1889–1977) – one of the highest-ranking and longest-lasting members of the Women's Social and Political Union
Anna Leonowens (1831–1915) – travel writer, educator and social activist
Elizabeth Roberts MacDonald (1864–1922) – writer; president, Women's Suffrage Association of Nelson, British Columbia
Nellie McClung (1873–1951) – politician, author, social activist, member of The Famous Five
Louise McKinney (1868–1931) – politician, women's rights activist, Alberta legislature
Emily Murphy (1868–1933) – women's rights activist, jurist, author
Irene Parlby (1868–1965) – women's farm leader, activist, politician
Eliza Ritchie (1856–1933) – educator and member of the executive of the Local Council of Women of Halifax
Octavia Ritchie (1868–1948) – physician
Emily Stowe (1831–1903) – doctor, campaigned for the country's first medical college for women
Jennie Fowler Willing (1834–1916) – educator, author, preacher, social reformer, suffragist
Thérèse Forget Casgrain (1896–1981) – leader of the Quebec suffragist movement

Chile
Celinda Arregui (1864–1941) – feminist politician, writer, teacher, suffrage activist 
Henrietta Müller (1846–1906) – Chilean-British women's rights activist and theosophist
Marta Vergara (1898–1995) – co-founder of MEMch; Inter-American Commission of Women delegate

China
 Lin Zongsu (1878–1944) – founder of the first suffrage organization in China

Colombia
 Lucila Rubio de Laverde (1908–1970) – co-founder of the suffrage organizations, Unión Femenina de Colombia (Women's Union of Colombia) (UFC) and the Alianza Femenina de Colombia (Women's Alliance of Colombia)
 María Currea Manrique (1890–1985) – co-founder of the suffrage organizations, Unión Femenina de Colombia (Women's Union of Colombia) (UFC) and the Alianza Femenina de Colombia (Women's Alliance of Colombia)

Czech Republic (Czechoslovakia)
 Karla Máchová (1853–1920) – women's rights activist who, in 1908, was among the first three women to run for the Bohemian Diet
 Františka Plamínková (1875–1942) – founded the Committee for Women's Suffrage in 1905 and served as a vice president of the International Council of Women, as well as the International Woman's Suffrage Alliance
Marie Tůmová (1866–1925) –– women's suffragist who, in 1908, was among the first three women to run for the Bohemian Diet
Zdeňka Wiedermannová-Motyčkova (1868–1915) – founder of the Provincial Organization of Progressive Moravian Women

Denmark

 Nanna Aakjær (1874–1962) – woodcarver, suffragist
 Matilde Bajer (1840–1934) – women's rights activist, suffragist, pacifist
 Jutta Bojsen-Møller (1837–1927) – women's rights activist, suffragist, educator
 Esther Carstensen (1873–1955) – voting rights campaigner, women's rights activist, journal editor
 Helen Clay Pedersen (1862–1950) – British-born Danish women's rights activist and suffragist
 Thora Daugaard (1874–1951) – suffragist, women's rights activist, peace activist, editor
 Charlotte Eilersgaard (1858–1922) – novelist, playwright, women's rights activist, suffragist
 Mathilde Fibiger (1830–1872) – feminist writer
 Eline Hansen (1859–1919) – co-founder of Dansk Kvinderaad, later Danske Kvinders Nationalråd (DKN)
 Meta Hansen (1865–1941) – active in Copenhagen's Women's Suffrage Association and the National Association for Women's Suffrage
 Charlotte Klein (1834–1915) – women's rights activist and educator
 Kristiane Konstantin-Hansen – textile artist, feminist, suffragist
 Line Luplau (1823–1891) – co-founder and chairperson of the Danske Kvindeforeningers Valgretsforbund or DKV
 Elna Munch (1871–1945) – co-founder of the Landsforbundet for Kvinders Valgret (National Association for Women's Suffrage) or LKV
 Johanne Münter (1844–1921) – writer, women's rights activist, suffragist
 Nielsine Nielsen (1850–1916) – physician, suffragist, feminist, politician
 Louise Nørlund (1854–1919) – co-founder and chairperson of the Danske Kvindeforeningers Valgretsforbund or DKV
 Charlotte Norrie (1855–1940) – nurse, feminist, suffragist, educator
 Johanne Rambusch (1865–1944) – co-founder of the Landsforbundet for Kvinders Valgret (Country Association for Women's Suffrage) or LKV
 Vibeke Salicath (1861–1921) – feminist, suffragist and journalist
 Caroline Testman (1839–1919) – co-founder and chairman of the Dansk Kvindesamfund
 Ingeborg Tolderlund (1848–1935) – women's rights advocate and suffragist active in Thisted
 Clara Tybjerg (1864–1941) – feminist, suffragist, peace activist, educator

Egypt
 Doria Shafik (1908–1975) – feminist, poet and editor
Huda Sha'arawi (1879–1947) – feminist, activist, nationalist, revolutionary, founder of the Egyptian Feminist Union

El Salvador
 María Álvarez de Guillén (1889–1980) – novelist and inaugural member of the Inter-American Commission of Women
 Rosa Amelia Guzmán – one of the first 3 women to gain a seat in the Legislative Assembly of El Salvador

Finland
 Maikki Friberg (1861–1927) – educator, journal editor, suffragist and peace activist
 Annie Furuhjelm (1859–1937) – journalist, feminist activist and politician
 Alexandra Gripenberg (1857–1913) – writer, newspaper publisher, suffragist, women's rights activist
 Lucina Hagman (1953–1946) – feminist, suffragist, early politician
 Hilda Käkikoski (1864–1912) – women's activist, suffragist, writer, schoolteacher, early politician
 Olga Oinola (1865–1949) – President of the Finnish Women Association

France

 Marie-Rose Astié de Valsayre (1846–1939) – feminist, suffragist, established the Ligue de l'Affranchissement des femmes in 1889
 Hubertine Auclert (1848–1914) – feminist, campaigner
 Olympe Audouard (1832–1890) – feminist, women's rights activist, suffragist 
 Marthe Bray (1884–1949) – feminist, suffragist 
 Cécile Brunschvicg (1877–1946) – feminist politician, secretary-general of the French Union for Women's Suffrage
 Maria Deraismes (1828–1894) – author, major pioneering force for women's rights
 Jeanne Deroin (1805–1894) – socialist feminist
 Marguerite Durand (1864–1936) – stage actress, journalist, founder of her own newspaper
 Blanche Edwards-Pilliet (1858–1941) – physician, activist, suffragist 
 Nicole Girard-Mangin (1878–1919) – army physician, suffragist
 Olympe de Gouges (1748–1793) – playwright and political activist
 Caroline Kauffmann (1840–1926) – feminist, women's rights activist, suffragette
 Germaine Malaterre-Sellier (1889–1967) – nurse, suffragist and pacifist
 Louise Michel (1830–1905) – anarchist, school teacher, medical worker
 Héra Mirtel (1868–1931) – writer, feminist, salonnier, suffragist
 Jane Misme (1865–1935) – journalist, feminist, suffragist
 Jeanne Oddo-Deflou (1846–1915) – translator, educator, feminist and suffragist, founder of Groupe français d'Etudes féministes in 1891
 Madeleine Pelletier (1874–1939) – physician, psychiatrist, socialist activist
 Maria Pognon (1844–1925) – writer, feminist, suffragist and pacifist
 Colette Reynaud (1872–1965) – feminist, socialist and pacifist journalist; co-founder of La Voix des femmes in 1917
 Léonie Rouzade (1839–1916) – feminist, suffragist, writer and socialist politician
 Henriette Sauret (1890–1976) – feminist, author, pacifist, journalist; member of French Union for Women's Suffrage
 Maria Vérone (1874–1939) – feminist, suffragist, women's rights activist
 Louise Weiss (1893–1983) – writer, feminist, politician, suffragist
 Marguerite de Witt-Schlumberger (1853–1924) – proponent of pronatalism and alcoholic abstinence, president of the French Union for Women's Suffrage

Georgia
Ekaterine Gabashvili (1861–1938)) – writer, feminist and suffragist
Babilina Khositashvili (1884–1973) – poet, labour rights activist and suffragist
Nino Tkeshelashvili (1874–1956) – feminist, suffragist, writer

Germany

Jenny Apolant (1874–1925) – Jewish feminist, suffragist
Anita Augspurg (1857–1943) – jurist, actress, writer, pacifist, suffragist
Luise Büchner  (1821–1877) – writer, women's rights activist
Marie Calm (1832–1887) – educator, writer
Minna Cauer (1841–1922) – educator, journalist, women's rights proponent, suffragist
Adela Coit (1863–1932) – suffragist
Hedwig Dohm (1831–1919) – feminist, writer, pacifist 
Henriette Goldschmidt (1825–1920) – feminist, social worker 
Lida Gustava Heymann (1868–1943) – women's rights activist, suffragist
Marie Loeper-Housselle (1837–1916) – educator 
Luise Koch (1860–1934) – educator, women's rights activist, suffragist, politician
Helene Lange (1848–1930) – educator, pioneering women's rights activist, suffragist
Bertha von Marenholtz-Bülow – educator
Lina Morgenstern (1830–1909) – educator, women's rights activist
Louise Otto-Peters (1819–1895) – suffragist, women's rights activist, writer
Auguste Schmidt (1833–1902) – educator, women's rights activist
Marie Stritt (1855–1928) – women's rights activist, suffragist, leading member of the International Woman Suffrage Alliance
Mathilde Weber (1829–1901) – social worker
Clara Zetkin (1857–1933) – Marxist theorist, women's rights activist, suffragist, politician

Greece
Kalliroi Parren (1861–1940) – founder of the Greek women's movement
Avra Theodoropoulou (1880–1963) – music critic, pianist, suffragist, women's rights activist, nurse

Haiti
 Yvonne Sylvain (1907–1989) – first female doctor from Haiti and advocate for gender equality

Honduras
 Graciela Bográn (1896–2000) – educator, writer, women's rights activist

Hungary
 Vilma Glücklich (1872–1927) – educator, pacifist, suffragist, feminist
 Rosika Schwimmer (1877–1948) – pacifist, feminist and suffragist
 Adele Zay (1848–1928) – Transylvanian teacher, feminist and suffragist

Iceland
 Bríet Bjarnhéðinsdóttir (1856–1940) – founded the first women's magazine and first suffrage organization in Iceland
 Ingibjörg H. Bjarnason (1867–1941) – politician, suffragist, schoolteacher, gymnast

India
Annie Besant (1847–1933) – British socialist, theosophist, women's rights activist, writer, orator, educationist, philanthropist
Margaret "Gretta" Cousins (1878–1954) – Irish-Indian suffragist, established All India Women's Conference, co-founded Irish Women's Franchise League
Sarojini Naidu (1879–1949) – political activist, poet
Catherine Hilda Duleep Singh (1871–1942) – activist, second daughter of H.H. Maharaja Sir Duleep Singh and Maharani Bamba née Müller
Sophia Duleep Singh (1876–1948) – had a leading role Women's Tax Resistance League, the Women's Social and Political Union
Herabai Tata (1879–1941) – argued before British government commissions that suffrage should be extended in India

Indonesia
Thung Sin Nio (1902–1996) – women's rights activist, physician, economist, politician

Iran
Annie Basil (1911–1995) – Iranian-Indian activist for Armenian women
Táhirih (1817–1852) – also known as Fatimah Baraghani, renowned poet, removed her veil in public, "first woman suffrage martyr"

Ireland

Elizabeth Bell (1862–1934) – Belfast’s first female physician, direct-action protester.
Louie Bennett (1870–1956) – suffragette, trade unionist, writer
Mary Fleetwood Berry (1865–1956) – suffragist, radical feminist
Cadiz sisters – Rosie and Lily also known as Jane and Maggie Murphy 
Cissie Cahalan (1876–1948) – trade unionist, feminist, suffragette
Winifred Carney (1887–1943) – suffragist, trade unionist and Irish independence activist
Helen Chenevix (1886–1963) – suffragist, trade unionist
Frances Power Cobbe (1822–1904) – writer, suffragist, animal advocate, women's suffrage campaigner
Meg Connery (1879–1956) – suffragist organiser and activist
Margaret "Gretta" Cousins (1878–1954) – Irish-Indian, established All India Women's Conference, co-founded Irish Women's Franchise League 
Mabel Sharman Crawford (1820–1912) – Irish adventurer, feminist and writer
Charlotte Despard (1844–1939) – Anglo-Irish suffragist, socialist, pacifist, Sinn Féin activist, and novelist
Margaret Dockrell (1849–1926) – suffragist, philanthropist, councillor
Marion Duggan (1884–1943) – Irish suffragist and activist
Norah Elam (1878–1961) – Irish-born British suffragette and fascist
Dr. Maude Glasgow (1876–1955) – early pioneer in public health and preventive medicine as well as an activist for equal rights
Maud Gonne (1866–1953) – British-born Irish revolutionary, suffragette and actress
Eva Gore-Booth (1870–1926) – poet, dramatist, suffragette, labour activist
Anna Haslam (1829–1922) – founder of the Dublin Women's Suffrage Association
Marjorie Hasler (c. 1887–1913) – suffragette, "first martyr"
Mary Hayden (1862–1942) – suffragist, women's rights activist
Rosamond Jacob (1888–1960) – writer, suffragist, republican activist
Marie Johnson (1874–1974) – Irish trade unionist, suffragist and teacher
Laura Geraldine Lennox (1883–1958) – suffragette and war volunteer in Paris
Isa Macnie (1869–1958) – croquet champion, cartoonist, suffragist and activist
Mary MacSwiney (1872–1942) – suffragist, politician, educationalist
Margaret McCoubrey (1880–1955) – Scottish-born Irish suffragist, co-operative movement activist
Elizabeth McCracken (1871–1944) – feminist writer, refused wartime suspension of suffragist struggle.
Lillian Metge (1871–1954), “Lisburn bomber”: direct action suffragette
Constance Markievicz (1868–1927) – politician, revolutionary, suffragette
Florence Moon (fl. 1914) – suffragist, member of the Women's National Health Association
Marguerite Moore (1849–1933) – nationalist activist, suffragist, "first suffragette"
Alicia Adelaide Needham (1863–1945) – song composer, suffragette
Kathleen Cruise O'Brien (1886–1938) – suffragist, Irish language advocate, teacher
May O'Callaghan (1881–1973) – suffragette, communist
Mary Donovan O'Sullivan (1887–1966) – history professor, suffragist
Alice Oldham (1850–1907) – education campaigner, academic, suffragist
Sarah Persse (fl. 1899) – suffragist
Anne Isabella Robertson (c. 1830–1910) – writer and suffragist
Hanna Sheehy-Skeffington (1877–1946) – founder-member of the Irish Women's Franchise League
Margaret Skinnider (1892–1971) – Scottish-born Irish revolutionary, feminist, suffragist
Isabella Tod (1836–1896) – Scottish-born Irish unionist, helped secure women the municipal vote in Belfast.
Catherine Winter (campaigner) (died 1870) – Irish publicist, suffragist and campaigner
Jenny Wyse Power (1858–1941) – feminist, politician, suffragist
Edith Young (1882–1974) – Irish suffragist organiser and activist

Italy
Elisa Agnini Lollini (1858–1922) – pioneering feminist, pacifist, suffragist and politician
 Margherita Ancona (1881–1966) – IWSA board member and delegate to the Inter-Allied Women's Conference
Alma Dolens (1869–1948) – pacifist, suffragist and journalist, founder of several women's organizations
Anna Kuliscioff (1857–1925) – Russian-born feminist, suffragist and politician active in Italy
Linda Malnati (1855–1921) – influential women's rights activist, trade unionist, suffragist, pacifist and writer
Anna Maria Mozzoni (1837–1920) – pioneering women's rights activist and suffragist
Eugenia Rasponi (1873–1958) – suffragist, business woman, and early lesbian activist
Ada Sacchi Simonetta (1874–1944) – women's rights activist, founder and leader of women's organizations
Gabriella Rasponi Spalletti (1853–1931) – feminist, educator and philanthropist, founder of the National Council of Italian Women in 1903
Alice Schiavoni Bosio (1871–1931) – delegate to both the 1915 Women at the Hague Conference and 1919 Inter-Allied Women's Conference

Japan
Raicho Hiratsuka (1886–1971)
Fusae Ichikawa (1893–1981) – founded the nation's first women's suffrage organization, the Women's Suffrage League of Japan; president of the New Japan Women's League
Shidzue Katō (1897–2001)
Oku Mumeo (1895–1997)
Shigeri Yamataka (1899–1977)

Jordan 
 Emily Bisharat (died 2004) – first female lawyer in Jordan, fought for women's suffrage

Liechtenstein
Melitta Marxer (1923–2015) – one of the "Sleeping Beauties" who took the issue of women's suffrage to the Council of Europe in 1983

Mexico
Hermila Galindo (1896–1954) – Mexican feminist, secretary to President Venustiano Carranza and affected his views on women's rights

Netherlands
 Jeltje de Bosch Kemper (1836–1916) – feminist
 Lizzy van Dorp (1872–1945) –  lawyer, economist, politician, feminist
 Wilhelmina Drucker (1847–1925) – politician, writer
 P. van Heerdt tot Eversberg-Quarles van Ufford (1862–1939) – feminist, artist, and peace activist
 Mariane van Hogendorp (1834–1909) – feminist
 Mietje Hoitsema (1847–1934)
 Cornélie Huygens (1848–1902)
 Aletta Jacobs (1854–1929) – Chairperson of Vereeniging voor Vrouwenkiesrecht, 1903–1919
 Martina Kramers (1863–1934) – feminist
 Rosa Manus (1881–1943) – pacifist
 Catharine van Tussenbroek (1852–1925) – physician, feminist
 Annette Versluys-Poelman (1853–1914) – chairperson of Vereeniging voor Vrouwenkiesrecht 1894–1902
 Clara Meijer-Wichmann (1885–1922) – lawyer, writer, anarcho-syndicalist, feminist, atheist
 Mien van Wulfften Palthe (1875–1960) – feminist and pacifist

Newfoundland 
 Margaret Davidson (1871–1964) – member of Women's Patriotic Association, named Dame Commander of the Order of the British Empire for her work with the Red Cross Society and the Scouting and Girl Guides in New South Wales
 Margaret Iris Duley (1894–1968) – considered Newfoundland's first novelist, member of Women's Patriotic Association
 Julia Salter Earle (1878–1945) – suffragist, trade unionist, one of the first three women to run for St. John's Municipal Council
 Armine Nutting Gosling (1861–1942) – member of Women's Patriotic Association, suffragette, founder and first Secretary of the Ladies Reading Room and Current Events Club, first female member of the Council of Higher Education in Newfoundland
 Fannie Knowling McNeil (1869–1928) – suffragist, social activist, member of the Newfoundland Women's Franchise League, and co-founder of the Newfoundland Society of Art, one of the first three women to run for St. John's Municipal Council
Janet Morison Miller (1891–1946) – first woman added to the rolls of the Newfoundland Law Society
Mary Southcott (1862–1943) – nurse, hospital administrator and campaigner
Helena Squires (1879–1959) – social activist, first woman to win a seat in the Newfoundland House of Assembly

New Zealand

Georgina Abernethy (c. 1859–1906) – active in the Wesleyan church and local Women's Franchise League 
Lily Atkinson (1866–1921) – speaker, writer, active in many Wellington clubs, president of Women's Christian Temperance Union of New Zealand (WCTU NZ)
Ruth Atkinson (1861–1927) – suffragist and temperance activist in Nelson 
Amey Daldy (1829–1920) – major leader and recruiter
Harriet Sophia Cobb (1855–1929) – signer of the 1893 Women's Suffrage Petition
Meri Mangakāhia (1868–1920) – Māori campaigner for women's suffrage
Harriet Morison (1862–1925) – co-founded the Dunedin Franchise League
Mary Müller (1819/1820?–1901) – "New Zealand's pioneer suffragist", pamphleteer, writer 
Helen Nicol (1854–1902) – co-founded the Dunedin Women's Franchise League
Robina Nicol (1861–1942) – signer of the 1893 Women's Suffrage Petition
Frances Mary "Fanny" Parker OBE (1875–1924) – New Zealand-born British suffragette 
Mary Powell (1854–1946) – suffragist and temperance activist
Lizzie Frost Rattray (1855–1931) – journalist, suffragist and welfare worker
Annie Jane Schnackenberg (1835–1905) – founding member of Auckland branch Women's Christian Temperance Union of New Zealand in February 1885; National President 1891–1901; President Auckland WCTU 1889–1897
Kate Sheppard (1848–1934) – served as national Franchise Superintendent for the Women's Christian Temperance Union of New Zealand (WCTU NZ) which pushed the petition campaigns to win woman suffrage in 1893; appears on the New Zealand ten-dollar note
Margaret Sievwright (1844–1905) – helped establish the National Council of Women; President 1901–1904
Anna Stout (1858–1931) – helped establish the WCTU NZ; 1892 President of the Women's Franchise League of Dunedin; 1896 Vice President for the National Council of Women of New Zealand
Ada Wells (1863–1933) – 1880s activist who later established the Canterbury Women's Institute

See also
List of New Zealand suffragists

Nicaragua
 Josefa Toledo de Aguerri, also called Josefa Emilia Toledo Murillo (1866–1962) – Nicaraguan feminist, writer and reform pedagogue

Nigeria 

 Funmilayo Ransome-Kuti (1900–1978) – educator and activist who fought for women's enfranchisement and political representation

Norway
 Randi Blehr (1851–1928) – chairperson and co-founder of the Norwegian Association for Women's Rights 
 Anna Bugge (1862–1928) – chairman of the Norwegian Association for Women's Rights, also active in Sweden
 Gudrun Løchen Drewsen (1867–1946) – Norwegian-born American women's rights activist and painter, promoted women's suffrage in New York City
 Betzy Kjelsberg (1866–1950) – co-founder of the Norwegian Association for Women's Rights (1884), the National Association for Women's Suffrage (1885)
 Gina Krog (1847–1916) – co-founder of the Norwegian Association for Women's Rights 
 Ragna Nielsen (1845–1924) – chairperson of the Norwegian Association for Women's Rights 
 Thekla Resvoll (1871–1948) – head of the Norwegian Female Student's Club and on the board of the women's suffrage movement (Kvinnestemmeretsforeningen)
 Anna Rogstad (1854–1938) – vice president of the Association for Women's Suffrage
 Hedevig Rosing (1827–1913) – co-leader of the movement in Norway; author, educator, school founder

Panama 
 Elida Campodónico (1894–1960) – teacher, women's rights advocate, attorney, first woman ambassador in Latin America
 Clara González (1898–1990) – feminist, lawyer, judge, and activist
 Gumercinda Páez (1904–1991) – teacher, women's rights activist and suffragette, and Constituent Assemblywoman of Panama

Peru 
 Aurora Cáceres (1877–1958) – writer and suffragist

Philippines
 Josefa Llanes Escoda (1898–1945) – civic leader and founder of the Girl Scouts of the Philippines
 Concepción Felix (1884–1967) – feminist and human rights activist
 Pura Villanueva Kalaw (1886–1954) – beauty queen, feminist, journalist, and writer
 Pilar Hidalgo-Lim (1893–1973) – educator and civic leader
 Rosa Sevilla (1879–1954) – activist, educator, and journalist

Poland
Maria Dulębianka (1861–1919) – artist, activist and suffragist

Portugal
Carolina Beatriz Ângelo (1878–1911) – physician and the first woman to vote in Portugal
Adelaide Cabete (1867–1935) – feminist
Ana de Castro Osório (1872–1935) – political feminist, suffragist
Olga Morais Sarmento (1881–1948) – writer and feminist
Maria Veleda (1871–1955) – educator, writer and suffragist
Maria Evelina de Sousa (1879–1946) – educator, journalist, feminist, suffragist
Maria Lamas (1893–1983) – writer, feminist, political prisoner
Alice Moderno (1867–1946) – writer, feminist, active campaigner for women's rights and animals rights

Puerto Rico 
 Isabel Andreu de Aguilar (1887–1948) – educator, helped establish the Puerto Rican Feminist League, was president of Puerto Rican Association of Women Suffragists, and first woman to run for Senate in PR
 Milagros Benet de Mewton (1868–1948) – teacher who filed a lawsuit to press for suffrage
 Carlota Matienzo (1881–1926) – teacher, one of the founders of the Puerto Rican Feminine League and the Suffragist Social League
 Felisa Rincón de Gautier  (1897–1994) – mayor of San Juan, first woman to hold post of mayor of a capitol city in the Americas

Romania
Maria Baiulescu (1860–1941) – Austro-Hungarian born Romanian writer, suffragist and women's rights activist
 Ana Conta-Kernbach (1865–1921) – teacher, pedagogue, writer, women's rights activist, suffragist
 Eugenia de Reuss Ianculescu (1866–1938) – teacher, writer, women's rights activist, suffragist
 Clara Maniu (1842–1929) – feminist, suffragist
 Elena Meissner (1867–1940) – feminist, suffragist, headed Asociația de Emancipare Civilă și Politică a Femeii Române

Serbia
Helen Losanitch Frothingham (1885–1972) – nurse, humanitarian, feminist, suffrage campaigner

South Africa
Anna Petronella van Heerden (1887–1975) – campaigned for women's suffrage in the 1920s
Julia Solly (1862–1953) – British-born South African feminist and suffragist who helped acquire the vote for white women in 1930
Lady Barbara Steel (1857–1943) – helped acquire the vote for white women in 1930

Spain
Concepción Arenal (1820–1893) – pioneer and founder of the feminist movement in Spain; activist, writer, journalist and lawyer
Emilia Pardo Bazán (1851–1921) – Spanish writer, journalist, university professor and support for women's rights and education
Carmen de Burgos  (1867–1932) – Spanish journalist, writer, translator and women's rights activist
Clara Campoamor (1888–1972) – Spanish politician and feminist best known for her advocacy for women's rights and suffrage during the writing of the Spanish constitution of 1931
María Espinosa de los Monteros (1875–1946) – Spanish women's rights activist, suffragist and business executive
Victoria Kent (1891–1987) – Spanish lawyer, suffragist and politician

Sweden

 Gertrud Adelborg  (1853–1942) – Secretary and leading member of the suffrage movement, presented the first demand of woman suffrage to the government
 Elsa Alkman (1878–1975) – suffragist, women's rights activist, writer and composer
 Eva Andén (1886–1970) – lawyer, feminist and suffragist
 Carolina Benedicks-Bruce (1856–1935) – sculptor, women's rights activist and suffragist
 Signe Bergman (1869–1960)  – co-founder and Chairperson of the National Association for Women's Suffrage
 Nina Benner-Anderson (1865–1947) – nurse, pacifist and suffragist
 Ella Billing (1869–1921) – women's rights activist and suffragist
 Hilma Borelius (1869–1932) – literary historian, academic and suffragist
 Kristina Borg (1844–1928) – newspaper publisher, suffragist and peace activist
 Fredrika Bremer (1801–1865) – prominent novelist and early women's rights activist
 Emilia Broomé (1866–1925) – first woman in the legislative assembly, introduced the new laws of equal access to all government posts for both genders
 Märta Bucht (1882–1962) – suffragist and peace activist from Luleå
 Frigga Carlberg (1851–1925) – Chairperson of the National Association for Women's Suffrage (Gothenburg branch)
 Maria Cederschiöld (1856–1935) – journalist, women's rights activist and suffragist
 Lizinka Dyrssen (1866–1952) – women's rights activist and suffragist
 Ebba von Eckermann (1866–1960) – women's rights activist and suffragist
 Lisa Ekedahl (1895–1980) – lawyer and suffragist
 Elin Engström (1860–1956) – politician, trade unionist and suffragist
 Hanna Ferlin (1870–1947) – photographer and suffragist
 Karin Fjällbäck-Holmgren (1881–1963) – politician, social welfare activist and suffragist
 Mia Green (1870–1949) – photographer, human rights activist and suffragist
 Sofia Gumaelius (1840–1915)  – Treasurer of the National Association for Women's Suffrage
 Ellen Hagen (1873–1967) – suffragist, women's rights activist and politician
 Gerda Hellberg (1870–1937) – women's rights activist and suffragist
 Lilly Hellström (1866–1930) – schoolteacher, children's newspaper editor and suffragist
 Anna Hierta-Retzius (1841–1924) – women's rights activist, suffragist and philanthropist
 Lina Hjort (1881–1959) – suffragist in Kiruna 
 Ann-Margret Holmgren (1850–1940) – co-founder and leading campaigner and recruiter for the National Association for Women's Suffrage
 Amanda Horney (1857–1953) – politician, women's rights activist and suffragist
 Ebba Hultkvist (1876–1955) – schoolteacher, suffragist and politician
 Emma Isakson (1880–1952) – newspaper publisher and suffragist
 Ellen Key (1849–1926) – suffragist, ideologist
 Edit Kindvall (1866–1951) – teacher, photographer, suffragist and women's rights activist
 Anna Kleman (1862–1940) – Swedish suffragist and peace activist
Sigrid Kruse (1867–1950) – schoolteacher, children's writer and active suffragist
 Klara Lindh (1877–1914) – suffragist, writer, editor
 Anna Lindhagen (1870–1941) – politician, women's rights activist and suffragist
 Cecilia Milow (1856–1946) – writer, educator and suffragist
 Bertha Nordenson (1857–1928) – women's rights activist and suffragist
 Astrid Nyberg (1877–1928) – pioneering newspaper editor and suffragist
 Valborg Olander (1861–1943) – Chairperson of the National Association for Women's Suffrage (local branch)
 Agda Östlund (1870–1942) – politician and suffragist
 Betty Olsson (1871–1950) – suffragist, women's rights and peace activist
 Ebba Palmstierna (1877–1966) – noblewoman and suffragist
 Gulli Petrini (1867–1941) – writer, suffragist, women's rights activist and politician
 Anna Pettersson (1861–1929) – lawyer and suffragist
 Aurore Pihl (1850–1938) – headmistress, women's rights activist and suffragist
Gerda Planting-Gyllenbåga (1878–1950) – suffragist and social welfare expert
 Emilie Rathou (1862–1948) – journalist, editor, early suffragist
Anna-Clara Romanus-Alfvén (1874–1947) – physician, suffragist, women's rights activist and educator
Hilda Sachs (1857–1935) – journalist, writer, women's rights activist
Ellen Sandelin (1862–1907) –  physician and lecturer
Olga Segerberg (1868–1951) – photographer and suffragist
 Alexandra Skoglund (1862–1938) – suffragist, women's rights activist and politician
 Karolina Själander (1841–1925) – headmistress, women's rights activist, suffragist and politician 
Augusta Tonning (1857–1932) – teacher,  suffragist and pacifist
 Elin Wägner (1882–1949) – campaigner for the National Association for Women's Suffrage
 Lydia Wahlström (1869–1954) – co-founder and Chairperson of the National Association for Women's Suffrage
 Jenny Wallerstedt (1870–1963) – teacher, suffragist and local politician
 Anna Whitlock (1852–1930) – co-founder and Chairperson of the National Association for Women's Suffrage
 Karolina Widerström (1856–1949) – Chairperson of the National Association for Women's Suffrage

Switzerland
 Simone Chapuis-Bischof (born 16 March 1931) – head of the Association Suisse Pour les Droits de la Femme (ADF) and the president of the journal Femmes Suisses
 Caroline Farner (1842–1913) – the second female Swiss doctor
 Marie Goegg-Pouchoulin (1826–1899) – Swiss doctor and campaigner for the Swiss women's movement
 Marthe Gosteli (1917–2017) – Swiss suffrage activist and creator of the Swiss archive of women's history
 Ursula Koch (born 1941) – politician, refused the 'male' oath in the Zürich cantonal parliament; first women president of the Social Democratic Party of Switzerland (SP)
 Emilie Lieberherr (1924–2011) – Swiss politician who was a leading figure in the final struggle for women suffrage in Switzerland, and the famous 1969 March to Bern for women suffrage
 Rosa Neuenschwander (1883–1962) – pioneer in vocational education, founder of the Schweizerische Landfrauenverband or SLFV (Swiss Country Association for Women Suffrage)
 Camille Vidart (1854–1930) – suffragist, women's rights activist, pacifist and educator
 Julie von May (von Rued) (1808–1875) – feminist
 Helene von Mülinen (1850–1924) – founder of Switzerland's organized suffrage movement; created and served as first president of Bund Schweizerischer Frauenvereine (BSF)

Trinidad
 Beatrice Greig (born 1869) – suffragist, writer and advocate

United Kingdom

 Wilhelmina Hay Abbott (1884–1957) – editor and feminist lecturer, officer of the International Woman Suffrage Alliance
 Violet Aitken (1886–1987) – suffragette activist in the WSPU, imprisoned and force-fed, editor of The Suffragette
 Margaret Aldersley (1852–1940) – suffragist, feminist and trade unionist
 Mary Ann Aldham (1858–1940) – famously slashed a portrait in the Royal Academy in 1914
 Janie Allan (1868–1968) – suffragette activist and significant financial supporter of the WSPU; imprisoned for suffrage activities
 Doreen Allen (1879–1963) – militant suffragette 
 Mary Sophia Allen (1878–1964) – women's rights activist, pioneer policewoman, later involved in far right political activity
 Katharine Russell, Viscountess Amberley (1844–1874) – early advocate of birth control, president of the Bristol and West of England Women's Suffrage Society
 Elizabeth Garrett Anderson (1836–1917) – physician, feminist, first dean of a British medical school, first female mayor, and magistrate in Britain
 Louisa Garrett Anderson (1873–1943) – Chief Surgeon of Women's Hospital Corps, Fellow of Royal Society of Medicine, jailed for her suffragist activities
 Helen Archdale (1876–1949) – suffragette and journalist
 Jane Arthur (1827–1907) – educationalist, feminist and activist; campaigned for women's suffrage
 Margaret Ashton (1856–1937) – suffragist, local politician, pacifist
 Nancy Astor, Viscountess Astor (1879–1964) – politician, socialite, first woman to sit as a Member of Parliament in the British House of Commons
 Barbara Ayrton-Gould (1886–1950) – Labour politician and co-founder of the United Suffragists; jailed for her suffrage activities
Mary Anne Baikie (1861–1950) – Scottish suffragist who established the Orcadian Women's Suffrage Society
Sarah Jane Baines (1866–1951) – feminist and social reformer; jailed at least fifteen times
Minnie Baldock (c. 1864–1954) – co-founded the first London branch of the WSPU
 Frances Balfour (1858–1931) – president of the National Society for Women's Suffrage
 Florence Balgarnie (1856–1928) – British suffragette, speaker, pacifist, feminist, temperance activist
 Rachel Barrett (1874–1953) – member of the WSPU; editor of The Suffragette
 Janet Barrowman (1879–1955) – Scottish member of the WSPU; jailed for her suffragist activities
 Dorothea Beale (1831–1906) – educational reformer, author, Principal of the Cheltenham Ladies' College
 Harriette Beanland (born 1866) – British textile worker and Suffragette
 Lydia Becker (1827–1890) – biologist and astronomer, founder and publisher of the Women's Suffrage Journal
 Edith Marian Begbie (1866–1932) – militant suffragette who was force-fed 
Elizabeth Bell (1862–1934) – first woman to practice medicine in Ulster, WPSU militant.
 Mary Bell (1885–1943) – first Scottish women magistrate
 Sarah Benett (1850–1924) – Treasurer of the WFL and suffragette 
 Ethel Bentham (1861–1931) – doctor, politician, member of the National Union of Women's Suffrage Societies
 Annie Besant (1847–1933) – socialist, theosophist, women's rights activist, writer, orator, and supporter of Irish and Indian self-rule
 Rosa May Billinghurst (1875–1953) – member of the WSPU; jailed multiple times
 Teresa Billington-Greig (1877–1964) – co-founder of Women's Freedom League; jailed for her suffragist activities
 Catherine Hogg Blair (1872–1946) – Scottish suffragette and founder of the Scottish Women's Rural Institute, and member of the WSPU 
 Violet Bland (1863–1940) – member of the WSPU, force-fed in prison
 Barbara Bodichon (1827–1891) – educationalist, artist, feminist, activist for women's rights
 Lillie Boileau (1869–1930) – early member of the Women's Freedom League and the Union of Ethical Societies
 Margaret Bondfield (1873–1953) – politician, chair of the Adult Suffrage Society, first woman Cabinet minister in the United Kingdom

 Elsie Bowerman (1889–1973) – lawyer, member of the WSPU, RMS Titanic survivor
 Janet Boyd (1850–1928) – militant suffragette and hunger-striker
 Jane Esdon Brailsford (1876–1937) – Scottish suffragette
 Agnes Brown (1866–1943) – Scottish suffragist and writer
 Annie Leigh Browne (1851–1936) – co-founder of College Hall, London and of Women's Local Government Society
 Constance Bryer (1870–1952) – suffragette 
 Evaline Hilda Burkitt (1876–1955) – first suffragette to be force-fed
 Frances Buss (1827–1894) – headmistress, pioneer of women's education, member of the Kensington Society
 Josephine Butler (1828–1906) – feminist, author, social reformer concerned about the welfare of prostitutes
 Mary Burton (1819–1909), a Scottish social and educational reformer, and supporter of the Edinburgh National Society for Women's Suffrage
 Edward Caird (1835–1908) – founder member of the Glasgow and West of Scotland Association for Women's Suffrage
 Mona Caird (1854–1932) – English novelist and essayist who wrote in support of women's suffrage
 Mabel Capper (1888–1966) – activist in the WSPU; imprisoned many times, and force-fed
 Isabella Carrie (1878–1981) – schoolteacher and safe house keeper for the WSPU
 Dorothea Chalmers Smith (1874–1944) – doctor and suffragist
 Georgina Fanny Cheffins (1863–1932) – arrested for window smashing, held in HM Prison Holloway, force-fed
 Jane Clapperton (1832–1914) – philosopher, birth control pioneer, social reformer and suffragist 
 Alice Clark (1874–1934), served on the executive committee of the National Union of Women's Suffrage Societies
 Mary Jane Clarke (1862–1910) –  arrested for window smashing, held in HM Prison Holloway, force-fed
 Anne Clough (1820–1892) – teacher and promoter of higher education for women
 Lila Clunas (1876–1968) – Scottish suffragette and Labour party councillor
 Jane Cobden (1851–1947) – Liberal politician who was active in many radical causes; co-founder of the Women's Franchise League
 Leonora Cohen (1873–1978) – militant British suffragette and trade unionist; bodyguard for Emmeline Pankhurst

 Florence Annie Conybeare (1872–1916) – campaigned in support of women's suffrage, organized a meeting of the National Union of Women's Suffrage Societies 
 Selina Cooper (1864–1946) – textile mill worker, local magistrate, member of the North of England Society for Women's Suffrage
 Catherine Corbett (1869–1950) - British suffragette
 Jessie Craigen (c. 1835–1899) – working-class suffragist who gave speeches all around the country
 Muriel Craigie (1889–1971) - Scottish suffragist, and war volunteer organiser
 Virginia Mary Crawford (1862–1948) – Catholic suffragist, journalist and author, a founder of the Catholic Women's Suffrage Society.
 Helen Crawfurd (1877–1954) – suffragette, rent strike organiser and communist activist
 Maud Crofts (born 1889) – suffragist, author and first woman accepted as a solicitor 

 Mary Crudelius (1839–1877) – early supporter of women's suffrage and campaigner for women's education
 Helen Cruickshank (1886–1975) – was a Scottish poet and suffragette 
 Emily Davies (1830–1921) – co-founder of Kensington Society and Britain's first women's college, Girton College, Cambridge University
 Emily Wilding Davison (1872–1913) – militant activist, key member of the WSPU, died in a protest action at a racetrack 
 Margaret Davidson (suffragist) (1879–1978) – suffragist, volunteer war nurse, and early leader of Girl Guides
 John McAusland Denny (1858–1922) – Scottish businessman, Conservative Party politician and founder member of the Glasgow and West of Scotland Association for Women's Suffrage
 Charlotte Despard (1844–1939) – novelist, Sinn Féin activist, co-founder of the Women's Freedom League
 Agnes Dollan (1887–1966) – Scottish suffragette, political activist and pacifist
 Violet Mary Doudney (1889–1952) – teacher and militant suffragette 
 Katherine Douglas Smith (born 1878) – militant suffragette and WSPU organiser
 Flora Drummond (1878–1949) – organiser for WSPU, imprisoned nine times for her activism in Women's Suffrage movement, inspiring orator
 Marion Wallace Dunlop (1864–1942) – artist and suffragette
 Elsie Duval (1892–1919) – member of WSPU and first woman released under the Cat and Mouse Act
 Louise Eates (1877–1944) - was a British suffragette, chair of Kensington Women's Social and Political Union and a women's education activist.
 Maude Edwards (fl. 1914) – suffragette
 Norah Elam (1878–1961) – prominent member of the WSPU; imprisoned three times
 Elizabeth Clarke Wolstenholme Elmy (1833–1918) – public speaker and writer; formed the first British suffragist society, first paid employee of the British Women's Movement
 Dorothy Evans (1888–1944) – activist and organiser, worked for WSPU in England and the north of Ireland; imprisoned several times 
 Kate Williams Evans (1866–1961) – suffragette 
 Caprina Fahey (1883–1959) – received the Women's Social and Political Union (WSPU) Hunger Strike Medal "for Valour" in 1914
 Margaret Milne Farquharson (1884–c. 1936) – Scottish suffragette, MP candidate and leader of the National Political League campaigning for Palestine.
 Millicent Fawcett (1847–1929) – feminist, writer, political and union leader; president of the National Union of Women's Suffrage Societies
 Helen Fraser (1881–1979) – suffragist, speaker and artist
 Elizabeth Fry (1780–1845) – prison reformer, social reformer, philanthropist
 Edith Margaret Garrud (1872–1971) – first trainer of 'the Bodyguard', formed in response to the Cat and Mouse Act
 Elizabeth Finlayson Gauld (c. 1863–1941) - suffrage campaigner based in Edinburgh
 Katharine Gatty (1870–1952) – journalist, lecturer and militant suffragette for the WSPU
 Mary Gawthorpe (1881–1973) – socialist, trade unionist, editor, active in the suffrage movement in both England and the United States
 Ellison Scotland Gibb (1879–1970) – suffragette and chess player
 Margaret Skirving Gibb (1877–1954) – suffragette and chess player
 Marion Gilchrist (1864–1952) – doctor and suffragist
 Helga Gill (1885–1928) – Norwegian-born British suffragist who spoke at meetings
 Katie Edith Gliddon (1883–1967) – watercolour artist and militant suffragette.
 Frances Gordon (born c. 1874) – prominent in the militant wing of the Scottish women's suffrage movement; imprisoned and force-fed
 Gerald Gould (1885–1936) – writer, known as a journalist, reviewer, essayist, and poet; co-founder of United Suffragists
 Mary Pollock Grant (1876–1957) – Scottish suffragette, Liberal Party politician, missionary and policewoman.
Joan Lavender Bailie Guthrie (1889–1914) - British suffragette, and member of the Women's Social and Political Union
Elsa Gye (1881–1943) – Scottish suffragette, imprisoned for the cause, led WSPU branches in Nottingham and Newcastle
 Joan Lavender Bailie Guthrie (Laura Grey) (1888–1914) – suffragette and actress, imprisoned for window smashing
 Beatrice Forbes-Robertson Hale (1883–1967) – actress, lectured and wrote on women's rights
 Edith Hacon (1875–1952) – suffragist from Dornoch, World War One nursing volunteer and international socialite
 Florence Haig (1856–1952) – Scottish artist and suffragette who was decorated for imprisonments and hunger strikes.
 Cicely Hale (1884–1981) – health visitor and author; worked for the WSPU and The Suffragette
 Nellie Hall (1895–1929) – god-daughter of Emmeline Pankhurst, member of the WSPU; imprisoned twice
 Hazel Hunkins Hallinan (1890–1982) – American women's rights activist, journalist, and suffragist who moved to Britain and was active in the movement there
 Cicely Hamilton (1872–1952) – actress, writer, journalist, feminist
 Ishbel Hamilton-Gordon (1857–1939) – author, philanthropist, and an advocate of woman's interests
 Marion Coates Hansen (1870–1947) – early member of the WSPU, co-founder of the Women's Freedom League
 Keir Hardie (1856–1915) – Scottish founder of the Labour Party, later a campaigner for women's suffrage
 Emily J. Harding (1850–1940) – British artist, illustrator and suffragette
 Lillian Mary Harris (1887–1964) - English militant suffragette
 Jane Ellen Harrison (1850–1928) – linguist, feminist, co-founder of modern studies in Greek mythology, supporter of women's suffrage
 Evelina Haverfield (1867–1920) – aid worker and nurse in WWI, member of the WSPU, arrested several times
 Annie Elizabeth Helme (1874–1963) – suffragist, JP, first female mayor of Lancaster in 1932.
 Mary H. J. Henderson (1874–1938) - honorary secretary of Dundee Women's Suffrage Society, and administrator with Scottish Women's Hospitals for Foreign Service
 Elizabeth Ellen (Beth) Hesmondhalgh active 1907–1914, Hunger Strike Medal recipient
 Margaret Hills (1882–1967) – teacher, public speaker, feminist and socialist; organizer of the NUWSS Election Fighting Fund
 Edith Mary Hinchley (1870–1940) – artist and member of the Women's Freedom League
 Reverend Claude Hinscliff (1875–1964) – founder of the [Anglican] Church League for Women's Suffrage
 Emily Hobhouse (1860–1926) – exposed the squalid conditions in concentration camps in South Africa during the Second Boer War; active in the People's Suffrage Federation
 Olive Hockin (1881–1936) – artist and author; imprisoned after arson attacks suspected to be suffragette-related
 Winifred Holtby (1898–1935) – feminist, socialist, and writer, including a new voters guide for women in 1929
 Edith Sophia Hooper (1868–1926) – suffragist and biographer of Josephine Butler
 Winifred Horrabin (1887–1971) – socialist activist, journalist, member of the WSPU
 Clemence Housman (1861–1955) – author, illustrator, co-founder of the Suffrage Atelier
 Laurence Housman (1865–1959) – playwright, writer, illustrator, co-founder of the Suffrage Atelier
 Elizabeth How-Martyn (1875–1954) – member of the WSPU and co-founder of the Women's Freedom League
 Ellen Hughes (1867–1927) – Welsh writer, poet, suffragist
 Florence Hull (born 1878) – suffragette, member of WSPU, imprisoned in January 1913
 Agnes Husband (1852–1929) – Scottish politician and suffragette
 Elsie Inglis (1864–1917) – Scottish doctor, secretary of the Edinburgh National Society for Women's Suffrage
 Margaret Irwin (1858–1940) – trade unionist, suffragist and founder member of the Glasgow and West of Scotland Association for Women's Suffrage
 Christina Jamieson (1864–1942) – writer and suffragette

 Maud Joachim (1869–1947) – suffragette
 Jessie Keppie (1868–1951) - artist and subscriber to the Glasgow and West of Scotland Association for Women's Suffrage
 Ellen Isabel Jones (died 1948) – suffragette and close associate of the Pankhursts
 Helena Jones (1870–1946) – Welsh doctor and member of the WSPU, later critical of Emmeline Pankhurst
 Mabel Jones (1865–1923) – doctor and suffragette
 Annie Kenney (1879–1953) – leading figure in the WSPU
 Jessie Kenney (1887–1985) – leading suffragette, assaulted the British prime minister and the Home Secretary at golf course
 Nell Kenney (1876–1953) – suffragette
 Jessie Keppie (1868–1951) – artist and subscriber to Glasgow and West of Scotland Association for Women's Suffrage
 Alice Stewart Ker (1853–1943) – doctor, health educator and suffragette
 Edith Key (1872–1937) – secretary-organiser of the WSPU, Huddersfield branch, and author of the only surviving regional WSPU minute book
 Mary Stewart Kilgour (1851–1955) – educationalist and writer, co-founder of the Union of Practical Suffragists
 Adelaide Knight, (1871–1950) – secretary for the WSPU in Canning Town
 Anne Knight (1786–1862) – social reformer, pioneer of feminism, early suffragette and pamphleteer
 Annie Knight (1895–2006) – suffragette in Aberdeen Scotland
 Aeta Adelaide Lamb (1886–1928) – longest serving organiser in the WSPU
 George Lansbury (1859–1940) – social reformer and politician who allied himself with the WSPU
 Jennie Lee (1904–1988) – Scottish politician, elected MP aged 24 in 1929 by-election before suffrage was extended to women under 30
 Harriet Leisk (1853–1921) - chair of the Shetland Women's Suffrage Society
 Lilian Lenton (1891–1972) – active member of the WSPU, winner of a French Red Cross for her service in WWI
 Victoria Lidiard (1889–1992) – WPSU member and reputed to be the longest surviving British Suffragette 
 Anna Lindsay (activist) (1845–1903), Scottish women's rights activist
 Thomas Martin Lindsay (1843–1914) – Scottish historian, professor and founder member of the Glasgow and West of Scotland Association for Women's Suffrage
 Louisa Lumsden (1840–1935) - pioneer of female education and suffrage speaker
 Kathleen Lyttelton (1856–1907) – women's activist, editor and writer
 Lady Constance Lytton (1869–1923) – speaker and campaigner for prison reform, votes for women, and birth control
 Florence Macfarlane (1867–1947) – nurse and militant member of the WSPU
 Margaret Mackworth (1883–1958) – activist and director of more than thirty companies
 Sarah Mair (1846–1941) – campaigner for women's education and suffrage
 Lavinia Malcolm (1847–1920) – Scottish suffragist and local Liberal Movement politician, the first Scottish woman to be elected to a local council (1907) and the first woman Lord Provost of a Scottish burgh town, in Dollar, Clackmannanshire
 Flora Masson (1856–1937) - nurse, suffragist, writer and editor
 Edith Mansell Moullin (1859–1941) – suffragist, settlement worker, and Welsh feminist organisation founder
 Kitty Marion (1871–1944) – actress and political activist
 Dora Marsden (1882–1960) – anarcho-feminist, editor of literary journals, and philosopher of language
 Charlotte Marsh (1842–1909) – joined the WSPU in March 1907, set up the Independent WSPU in March 1916
 Selina Martin (1882–1972) – activist
 Harriet Martineau (1802–1876) – social theorist and writer
 Eleanor Marx (1855–1898) – activist and translator
 Flora Masson (1856–1937) – nurse, editor and writer
 Helen Matthews – Scottish suffragette and women's footballer
 Isabella Fyvie Mayo (1843–1914) – poet, novelist, suffragist, and reformer
 Mary Macarthur (1880–1921) – general secretary of the Women's Trade Union League and was involved in the formation of the National Federation of Women Workers and National Anti-Sweating League
 Ann Macbeth (1875–1948) – artist and suffragist
 Lilly Maxwell (1800–1876) – suffragist
 Elspeth McClelland (1879–1920) – architect and suffragette, 'human letter' sent with Daisy Solomon
 Janet McCallum (1881–1946) – trade unionist and suffragist
Margaret McCoubrey (1880–1955) – Belfast WSPU militant, pacifist, co-operatist.
Elizabeth McCracken (1871–1944) – feminist writer (" L.A.M. Priestley"), Belfast WSPU militant, refused wartime political truce with the government. 
 Agnes Syme Macdonald (1882–1966) – Scottish suffragette who served as the secretary of the Edinburgh branch of the WSPU before setting up the Edinburgh Women Citizens Association (WCA) in 1918
 Louisa Macdonald (1858–1949) - educationalist and suffragist
 Agnes McLaren (1837–1913) – doctor and secretary of the Edinburgh National Society for Women's Suffrage alongside her stepmother, Priscilla Bright McLaren
 Alice McLaren (1860–1945) –  doctor, Gynecologist, suffragist and advocate for women's health and women's rights
 Eva McLaren (1852–1921) – suffragist, writer, and political campaigner
 Priscilla Bright McLaren (1815–1906) – anti-slavery activist, Scottish suffragist, founder and president of Edinburgh National Society for Women's Suffrage
 Chrystal Macmillan (1872–1937) – politician, barrister, feminist and pacifist
 Frances McPhun (1880–1940) – suffragette who served two months in Holloway prison, sister of Margaret McPhun
 Margaret McPhun (1876–1960) – suffragette who served two months in Holloway prison, sister of Frances McPhun
 Frances Melville (1873–1962) – suffragist, advocate for higher education for women in Scotland, and one of the first women to matriculate at the University of Edinburgh
Lillian Metge (1871–1954) – bombed Christ Church Cathedral, Lisburn, WSPU Hunger Strike medalist.
 Jessie C. Methven (1854–1917) – Scottish suffragist, suffragette, honorary secretary of Edinburgh National Society for Women's Suffrage, joined WSPU 1906
 Alice Meynell (1847–1922) – editor, writer, and poet
 Harriet Taylor Mill (1807–1858) – philosopher and women's rights advocate
 John Stuart Mill (1806–1873) – philosopher, political economist, and civil servant
 Hannah Mitchell (1872–1956) – activist
 Dora Montefiore (1851–1933) – activist and writer
 Ethel Moorhead (1869–1955) – painter
 Graham Moffat (1866–1951) – actor, director, playwright and spiritualist. Husband of Maggie Moffat and founder of the Men's League for Women's Suffrage
 Maggie Moffat (1873–1943) – British actor and suffragette, wife of Graham Moffat
 Ethel Moorhead (1869–1955) – suffragette and painter
 Anna Munro (1881–1962) – activist
 Mary Murdoch (1864–1916) - physician and suffragist
 Eunice Murray (1878–1960) – suffragist, and only Scottish woman who stood for election when UK elections were opened to women in 1918
 Flora Murray (1869–1923) – medical pioneer and activist
 Frances Murray (1843–1919) – a suffragist raised in Scotland, an advocate of women's education, a lecturer in Scottish music and a writer
 Sylvia Murray (1875–1955) – suffragette and author, the sister of suffragette Eunice Guthrie Murray
 Margaret Mylne (1806–1892) – Scottish suffragette and writer
 Jessie Newbery (1864–1948) - Scottish artist and embroiderer, member of the Women's Social and Political Union
 Mary Neal (1860–1944) – social worker and collector of English folk dances
 Alison Roberta Noble Neilans (1884–1942) – activist, member of the executive committee of the Women's Freedom League
 Margaret Nevinson (1858–1932) – JP, Poor Law guardian, playwright, member of the Church League for Women's Suffrage
 Jessie Newbery (1864–1948) – artist and suffragist
 Elizabeth Pease Nicholl (1807–1897) –  abolitionist, anti-segregationist, suffragist, chartist and anti-vivisectionist
 Helen Ogston (1882–1973) – Scottish suffragette known for interrupting David Lloyd George on 5 December 1908 at a meeting in the Royal Albert Hall and subsequently holding off the stewards with a dog whip
 Ada Nield Chew (1870–1945) – organiser
 Florence Nightingale (1820–1910) – celebrated social reformer and statistician, and the founder of modern nursing
 Emily Rosaline Orme (1835–1915) – member of the Edinburgh National Society for Women's Suffrage
 Elizabeth Margaret Pace (1866–1957) – Scottish doctor, suffragist and advocate for women's health and women's rights
 Adela Pankhurst (1885–1961) – political organizer, co-founder of the Communist Party of Australia and the Australia First Movement
 Christabel Pankhurst (1880–1958) – co-founder and leader of the WSPU
 Emmeline Pankhurst (1858–1928) – a main founder and the leader of the British Suffragette Movement
 Sylvia Pankhurst (1882–1960) – campaigner and anti-fascism activist
 Frances Mary "Fanny" Parker OBE (1875–1924) – New Zealand-born suffragette prominent in the militant wing of the Scottish women's suffrage movement and repeatedly imprisoned for her actions
Grace Paterson (1843–1925) – school board member, temperance activist, suffragist, and founder of the Glasgow School of Cookery
 Isabella Bream Pearce (1859–1929) – Scottish socialist propagandist and suffrage campaigner
 Annie Seymour Pearson (born 1878) – work based suffrage activist who ran a safe house for suffragettes evading police
 Edith Pechey (1845–1908) – campaigner for women's rights, involved in a range of social causes
 Pleasance Pendred (1864–1948) – suffragette 
 Emmeline Pethick-Lawrence (1867–1954) – member Suffrage Society, secretary WSPU
 Leonora Philipps (1862–1915) – Liberal suffragist, president of Welsh Union of Women's Liberal Associations and co-founder of the Pioneer Club
 Caroline Philips (1874–1956) – feminist, suffragette and journalist
 Catherine Pine (1864–1941) – nurse, suffragette
 Isabella Potbury (1890–1965) – portrait painter, suffragette
 Clara Rackham (1875–1966) – magistrate, prison reformer, factory inspector, long-serving alderman and city councillor in Cambridge
 Jane Rae (1872–1959) – political activist, suffragette, councillor and Justice of the peace
 Eleanor Rathbone (1872–1946) – campaigner for women's rights
 Marion Kirkland Reid (1815–1902) – feminist and writer
 Mary Reid (1880–1921) – Scottish trades unionist
 Margaret Mackworth, 2nd Viscountess Rhondda (1883–1955) – WSPU member, journalist, businesswoman, founder of the feminist periodical Time and Tide
 Mary Richardson (1882–1961) – Canadian suffragette, arsonist, head of the women's section of the British Union of Fascists
 Edith Rigby (1872–1948) – founder of St. Peter's School, prominent activist
 Margaret Robertson (1892–1967) – campaigner; organiser of the Election Fighting Fund
 Elizabeth Robins (1862–1952) – Ibsen actress, playwright, public speaker, novelist
 Annot Robinson (1874–1925) – née Wilkie, nicknamed Annie, pacifist and suffragette 
 Rona Robinson (1881–1973) – suffragette and in 1905 the first woman in the United Kingdom to gain a first-class degree in chemistry
 Esther Roper (1868–1938) – social justice campaigner
 Arnold Stephenson Rowntree (1872–1951) – MP, philanthropist, and suffragist
 Lolita Roy (born 1865) – believed to have been an important organizer of the Women's Coronation Procession (a suffrage march in London) in 1911, and marched as part of it with either her sisters or her daughters
 Agnes Royden (1876–1956) – preacher
 Bertha Ryland (1882–1977) – militant suffragette 
 Myra Sadd Brown (1872–1938) – suffragette activist in the WSPU, imprisoned and force-fed
 Amy Sanderson (born c1875-6) – Scottish suffragette, imprisoned twice, executive member of WFL
 Margaret Sandhurst (1828–1892) – one of the first women elected to a city council in the United Kingdom
 Jessie Saxby (1842–1940) — author, folklorist and suffragette
 Arabella Scott (1886–1980) – Scottish suffragette who endured five weeks of solitary confinement in Perth prison and force feeding twice a day
 Evelyn Sharp (suffragist) (1869–1955) – journalist on The Manchester Guardian, short story writer, tax resister, founder of the United Suffragists
 Genie Sheppard (1863–1953) – medical doctor and militant suffragette
 Alice Maud Shipley (1869–1951) – suffragist who went on hunger strike in Holloway Prison and who was force fed
 Frances Simson (1854–1938) – suffragist, campaigner for women's higher education and one of the first of eight women graduates from the University of Edinburgh
 May Sinclair (1863–1946) – member of the Woman Writers' Suffrage League
 Sophia Duleep Singh (1876–1948) – had leading roles in the Women's Tax Resistance League, and the WSPU
 Margaret Skinnider (1892–1971)
 Ethel Smyth (1858–1944) – composer, writer
 Mary Anderson Snodgrass (1862–1945) – politician, suffragist and advocate for women's rights, member of the Glasgow and West of Scotland Association for Women's Suffrage
 Ethel Snowden (1881–1951) – socialist, human rights activist, feminist politician
 Jessie M. Soga (1870–1954) - Xhosa/Scottish contralto singer, music teacher and suffragist. She was described as the only black suffrage campaigner based in Scotland.
 Daisy Solomon (1882–1978) – South African born, member of WSPU, sent as 'human letter' with Elspeth McClelland, daughter of Georgiana Solomon
 Georgiana Solomon (1844–1933) – Scottish member of the WSPU, South African temperance activist
 Mary Somerville (1780–1872) – science writer and polymath
 Emma Sproson (1867–1936) – women's rights activist
 Catherine Helen Spence (1825–1910) – Scottish-born Australian author, teacher, journalist, politician & leading suffragist
 Emily Spender (1841–1922) – novelist and suffragette
 Lady Barbara Steel (1857–1943) – Scottish suffragist and tax resister
 Jessie Stephen (1893–1979) – working class suffragette and trade union activist
 Flora Stevenson (1839–1905) – Scottish social reformer with interest in education for poor or neglected children
 Louisa Stevenson (1835–1908) – Scottish campaigner for women's university education, effective, well-organised nursing
 Charlotte Carmichael Stopes (1840–1929) – scholar, author, and campaigner for women's rights
 Una Harriet Ella Stratford Duval (née Dugdale) (1879–1975) – suffragette and marriage reformer
 Lucy Deane Streatfeild (1865–1950) – civil servant, social worker, one of the first female factory inspectors in UK
 Ann Swaine (born in or before 1821–1883) – writer and advocate for women's higher education
 Annie S. Swan (1859–1943) – journalist, novelist and story writer
 Helena Swanwick (1864–1939) – feminist, pacifist
 Jane Taylour (1827–1905) – suffragist and women's movement campaigner
 Janie Terrero (1858–1944) – militant suffragette
 Dora Thewlis (1890–1976) – activist
 Agnes Thomson (born 1846) – Scottish suffragette, member of Edinburgh WSPU, missionary in India
 Elizabeth Thomson (born 1848) – Scottish suffragette, member of Edinburgh WSPU, hunger striker, missionary in India
 Elizabeth Thompson (1846–1933) – prominent painter
 Muriel Thompson (1875–1939) – World War I ambulance driver, racing driver and suffragist
 Violet Tillard (1874–1922) – nurse, pacifist, supporter of conscientious objectors, relief worker
 Isabella Tod (1836–1896) – Scottish suffragist, women's rights campaigner in the north of Ireland, helped women secure the municipal franchise in Belfast.
 Catherine Tolson (1890–1924) – suffragette 
 Helen Tolson (1888–1955) – suffragette 
 Florence Tunks (1891–1985) – suffragette
 Minnie Turner (1866–1948) – ran a guest house, the "Sea View", in Brighton
 Julia Varley (1871–1952) - trade unionist
 Marion Wallace Dunlop (1864–1942) – suffragette went on hunger strike after being arrested for militancy
 Olive Grace Walton (1886–1937) – suffragette
 Elizabeth (Bessie) Watson (1900–1992) – child suffragette and piper
 Mona Chalmers Watson (1872–1936) – physician and head of the Women's Army Auxiliary Corps
 Harriet Shaw Weaver (1876–1961) – political activist, magazine editor
 Edith Splatt (1873?–1945) - dressmaker, journalist, councillor in Devon
 Beatrice Webb (1858–1943) – sociologist, economist, socialist, labour historian, social reformer
 Vera Wentworth (1890–1957) – went to Holloway for the cause and was force fed. She door stepped and then assaulted the Prime Minister twice. She wrote "Three Months in Holloway".
 Rebecca West (1892–1983) – author, journalist, literary critic, travel writer
 Olive Wharry (1886–1947) – artist, arsonist
 Eliza Wigham (1820–1899) – suffragist and abolitionist
 Jane Wigham (1801–1888) – suffragist and abolitionist
 Ellen Wilkinson (1891–1947) – politician, Member of Parliament, served as Minister of Education
 Gertrude Wilkinson (1851–1929) – militant suffragette and member of the Women's Social and Political Union
 Laetitia Withall (1881–1963) – poet, author and militant suffragette 
 Celia Wray (1872–1954) – suffragette and architect
 I.A.R. Wylie (1885–1959) – Australian writer, suffragette in UK, working on The Suffragette
 Alice Zimmern (1855–1939) – teacher, writer

United States

Jane Kelley Adams (1852–1924) — educator; chair of the Woburn, Massachusetts Equal Suffrage League
Mary Newbury Adams (1837–1901) – suffragist and education advocate
Sadie L. Adams (1872–1945) – African-American suffragist and child welfare advocate
Jane Addams (1860–1935) – social activist, president Women's International League for Peace and Freedom
Edith Ainge (1873–1948) – member of Silent Sentinels, Treasurer for NWP, jailed five times
Mary A. Ahrens (1836–after 1907) – Chicago lawyer, plaintiff in lawsuit to enforce 1891 suffrage law for school elections
Mary Long Alderson (1860–1937) – Montana suffragist
Nina E. Allender (1873–1957) – speaker, organizer and cartoonist
Naomi Anderson (born 1863) – black suffragist, temperance advocate
Mary Garard Andrews (1852–1936) - president, Nebraska Suffrage Association
Susan B. Anthony (1820–1906) – co-founder and leader National Woman Suffrage Association, one of the leaders of the National American Woman Suffrage Association; Nineteenth Amendment to the United States Constitution, which guaranteed the right of women to vote, was popularly known as the Susan B. Anthony Amendment
Annie Arniel (1873–1924) – member of the Silent Sentinels, arrested eight times in direct actions
Sarah Louise Arnold (1859–1943) - Massachusetts suffragist; first dean of Simmons College; national president, Girls Scouts
Helen Vickroy Austin (1829–1921) – journalist, horticulturist, suffragist
Rosa Miller Avery (1830–1894) – American abolitionist, political reformer, suffragist, writer
Elnora Monroe Babcock (1852–1934) – pioneer leader in the suffrage movement; chair of the National Woman Suffrage Association's press department
Eugenia M. Bacon (1853–1933) – suffragist
Adella Brown Bailey (1860–1937) – politician and suffragist
Ida B. Wells-Barnett (1862–1931) – African-American journalist, newspaper editor, suffragist, sociologist, and early leader in the civil rights movement
Bertha Hirsch Baruch – writer, president of the Los Angeles Suffrage Association
Helen Valeska Bary (1888–1973) – suffragist, researcher, and social reformer
Octavia Williams Bates (1846–1911) – suffragist, clubwoman, author
Martia L. Davis Berry (1844–1894) – treasurer, Kansas Equal Suffrage Association
Clara Bancroft Beatley (1858–1923) – educator, lecturer, author; chair, Moral Education Department, Boston Equal Suffrage Association
Frances Estill Beauchamp (1860–1923) - Kentucky temperance activist, social reformer, lecturer, suffragist
Alva Belmont (1853–1933) – founder of the Political Equality League that was in 1913 merged into the Congressional Union for Woman Suffrage
Elsie Lincoln Benedict (1885–1970), suffragist leader representing Colorado for the Women's Right to Vote
Kate Himrod Biggers (1849–1935) – president of the Oklahoma Woman's Suffrage Association
Emily Montague Mulkin Bishop (1858–1916) – lecturer, instructor, author, pioneer suffragist
Irene Moorman Blackstone (1872–after 1944) – African-American suffragist instrumental in integrating the suffrage fight in New York
Alice Stone Blackwell (1857–1950) – journalist, activist
Antoinette Brown Blackwell (1825–1921) – co-founder, with Lucy Stone, of the American Woman Suffrage Association
Henry Browne Blackwell (1825–1909) – founded Woman's Journal with Lucy Stone
Katherine Devereux Blake (1858–1950) – educator, suffragist, peace activist
Lillie Devereux Blake (1833–1913) – writer, suffragist, reformer
Lucretia Longshore Blankenburg (1845–1937) – suffragist, reformer
Isabella Williams Blaney (1854–1933) – suffragist, politician
Harriot Eaton Stanton Blatch (1856–1940) – writer (contributor to History of Woman Suffrage), founded Women's Political Union, daughter of pioneering activist Elizabeth Cady Stanton
Amelia Bloomer (1818–1894) – women's rights and temperance advocate; her name was associated with women's clothing reform style known as bloomers
Anna Whitehead Bodeker (1826–1904) – leader of the earliest attempts to organize for suffrage in Virginia; co-founder and inaugural president of Virginia State Woman Suffrage Association, the first suffrage association in Virginia
Marietta Bones (1842–1901) – suffragist, social reformer, philanthropist
Helen Varick Boswell (1869–1942) – member of the Woman's National Republican Association and the General Federation of Women's Clubs
Lucy Gwynne Branham (1892–1966) – professor, organizer, lobbyist, active in the National Women's Party and its Silent Sentinels, daughter of suffragette Lucy Fisher Gwynne Branham
Madeline McDowell Breckinridge (1872–1920) – suffrage leader, one-time vice president of the National Woman Suffrage Association, one of Kentucky's leading Progressive reformers
Sophonisba Breckinridge (1866–1948) – activist, Progressive Era social reformer, social scientist and innovator in higher education
Minerva Kline Brooks (1883–1929) – suffragist
Gertrude Foster Brown (1867–1956) – pianist, suffragette, author of Your vote and how to use it (1918)
Olympia Brown (1835–1926) – activist, first woman to graduate from a theological school, as well as becoming the first full-time ordained minister
Emma Bugbee (1888–1981) – journalist
Emeline S. Burlingame (1836–1923) – editor, evangelist, suffragist
Lucy Burns (1879–1966) – women's rights advocate, co-founder of the National Woman's Party
Martha Callanan (1826–1901) – activist, editor and publisher of The Standard, Iowa suffragist journal
Mary Edith Campbell (1876–1962) – first woman elected to the Board of Education in Cincinnati, Ohio
Jennie Curtis Cannon (1851–1929) – Vice President of the National American Woman Suffrage Association
Susan E. Cannon Allen (1859–1935) – African American suffragist
Marion Hamilton Carter (1865–1937) – educator, journalist, suffragist author
Frances Jennings Casement (1840–1928) – voting advocate, married General John S. Casement, who lobbied for voting rights for women
Nettie Sanford Chapin (1830–1901) – represented Iowa at the National American Woman Suffrage Association convention of 1893
Carrie Chapman Catt (1859–1947) – president of the National American Woman Suffrage Association, founder of the League of Women Voters and the International Alliance of Women, campaigned for the Nineteenth Amendment to the United States Constitution
 Mariana Wright Chapman (1843–1907) – American social reformer, suffragist
Emily Thornton Charles (1845–1895) – poet, journalist, suffragist, newspaper founder
Mamie Claflin (1867–1929) – Nebraska temperance and suffrage leader; newspaper editor and publisher
Tennessee Celeste Claflin (1844–1923) – one of the first women to open a Wall Street brokerage firm, advocate of legalized prostitution
Adele Goodman Clark (1882–1983) – artist, suffragist, and co-founder of the Equal Suffrage League of Virginia
Laura Clay (1849–1941) – co-founder and first president of Kentucky Equal Rights Association, leader of women's suffrage movement, active in the Democratic Party
Mary Barr Clay (1839–1924) – first Kentuckian to hold the office of president in a national woman's organization (American Woman Suffrage Association), and the first Kentucky woman to speak publicly on women's rights
Lillian Exum Clement (1894–1925) – first woman elected to the North Carolina General Assembly and the first woman to serve in any state legislature in the Southern United States
H. Maria George Colby (1844–1910) – journalist, activist, suffragist
Emily Parmely Collins (1814–1909) – in South Bristol, New York, 1848, was the first woman in the U.S. to establish a society focused on woman suffrage and women's rights
Jennie Collins (1828–1887) – labor reformer, humanitarian, and suffragist
Mattie E. Coleman (1870–1943) – physician, suffragist 
Sarah Tarleton Colvin (1865–1949) – chairman of the Minnesota chapter of the National Woman's Party, arrested during the "Watchfire for Freedom" demonstrations
Helen Appo Cook (1837–1913) – prominent African American community activist and leader in the women's club movement
Ida Craft (1861–1947) – known as the Colonel, took part in Suffrage Hikes
Emma Amelia Cranmer (1858–1937) – reformer, suffragist, writer
Minnie Fisher Cunningham (1882–1964) – first executive secretary of the League of Women Voters, member of the National American Women's Suffrage Association
Lucile Atcherson Curtis (1894–1986) – first woman in what became the US Foreign Service
Martha E. Sewall Curtis (1858–1915) – president, Woburn (Massachusetts) Equal Suffrage League; State lecturer, Massachusetts Woman Suffrage Association
Madeleine Vinton Dahlgren (1825–1889) – writer, translator, anti-suffragist
Lucinda Lee Dalton (1847–1925) – Mormon feminist and writer
Maria Thompson Daviess (1872–1924) – co-founder and vice-president of the Equal Suffrage League chapter in Nashville, Tennessee; organizer of the Equal Suffrage League chapter in Madison, Tennessee. 
Carrie Chase Davis (1863–1953) – physician, suffragist
Paulina Kellogg Wright Davis (1813–1876) – a founder of the New England Woman Suffrage Association; active with the National Woman Suffrage Association; co-arranged and presided at the first National Women's Rights Convention
Jesse Leech Davisson (1860–1940) – suffragist active in Ohio
Cornelia De Bey (1860–1948) – homeopath, politician, suffragist, educator
Emma Smith DeVoe (1848–1927) – leading Washington State suffragist, founded the National Council of Women Voters
Addie Whiteman Dickerson (1878–1940) – African American clubwoman and suffragist
Mamie Dillard (1874–1954) – African American educator, clubwoman and suffragist
Mary L. Doe (1836–1913) – first president of the Michigan State Equal Suffrage Association
Rheta Childe Dorr (1868–1948) – journalist, suffragist newspaper editor, writer, and political activist 
Julia Dorsey (1850–1919) — African-American suffragist from Maryland
Eva Craig Graves Doughty (1852–1929) – president, Grand Rapids (Michigan) Equal Suffrage Association
Frederick Douglass (1818–1895) – African-American social reformer, orator, writer, statesman
Wilhelmine Kekelaokalaninui Widemann Dowsett (1861–1929) – Native Hawaiian suffragist, organized the National Women's Equal Suffrage Association of Hawaii
Anne Dallas Dudley (1876–1955) – suffrage activist; in 1920, she, along with Abby Crawford Milton and Catherine Talty Kenny, led the campaign in Tennessee to approve ratification of the Nineteenth Amendment to the United States Constitution 
Marion Howard Dunham (1842–1921), teacher, temperance activist, Iowa suffragist
Abigail Scott Duniway (1834–1915) – women's rights advocate, editor, writer
Zara DuPont (1869–1946) – first vice president of the Ohio Woman Suffrage Association
Crystal Eastman (1881–1928) – lawyer, antimilitarist, feminist, socialist, and journalist
Mary F. Eastman – educator, lecturer, writer, and suffragette
Max Eastman (1883–1969) – writer, philosopher, poet, prominent political activist
Sarah Stoddard Eddy (1831–1904) – social reformer, clubwoman; Massachusetts suffragist
Mary G. Charlton Edholm (1854–1935) – reformer and journalist
Katherine Philips Edson (1870–1933) – social worker and feminist, worked to add women's suffrage to the California State Constitution
Julia Emory (1885–1979) – suffragist from Maryland
Elizabeth Piper Ensley (1848–1919) – Caribbean-American woman who was the treasurer of the Colorado Non-Partisan Equal Suffrage Association
Helga Estby (1860–1942) – Norwegian immigrant, noted for her walk across the United States during 1896 to save her family farm
Caroline McCullough Everhard (1843–1902) – American banker and suffragist, president of the Ohio Suffrage Association
Elizabeth Glendower Evans (1856–1937) – social reformer and suffragist
Elizabeth Hawley Everett (1857–1940), Recording Secretary, Illinois Equal Suffrage Association
Janet Ayer Fairbank (1878–1951) – author and champion of progressive causes
Lillian Feickert (1877–1945) – suffragette; first woman from New Jersey to run for United States Senate
Mary Fels (1863–1953) – philanthropist, suffragist, Georgist
Susan Frances Nelson Ferree (1844–1919) – journalist, activist, suffragist
Susan Fessenden (1840–1932) – vice-president, Massachusetts Woman's Suffrage Association
Sara Bard Field (1882–1974) – active with the National Advisory Council, National Woman's Party, and in Oregon and Nevada; crossed the US to deliver a petition with 500,000 signatures to President Wilson 
Margaret Foley (1875–1957) – active with the Massachusetts Woman Suffrage Association
Jessica Garretson Finch (1871–1949) – president of the New York Equal Franchise Society
Mariana Thompson Folsom (1845–1909) – Universalist minister and lecturer for Iowa Suffrage Association and Texas Equal Rights
Clara S. Foltz (1849–1934) – lawyer, sister of US Senator Samuel M. Shortridge
Nellie Griswold Francis (1874–1969) – founded and led the Everywoman Suffrage Club, an African-American suffragist group in Minnesota, civil rights and anti-lynching activist
Ellen Sulley Fray (1832–1903) – one of the district presidents of the Ohio Women's Suffrage Association
Elisabeth Freeman (1876–1942) – Suffrage Hike participant
Antoinette Funk (1869–1942) – lawyer and executive secretary of the Congressional Committee of the National American Woman Suffrage Association; supporter of the women's movement in WWI
Matilda Joslyn Gage (1826–1898) – activist, freethinker, author
Edna Fischel Gellhorn (1878–1970) – reformer, co-founder of the National League of Women Voters
Sallie Topkis Ginns (1880–1976) – inductee in the Hall of Fame of Delaware Women
T. Adelaide Goodno (1858–1931) – suffragist; president, North Carolina Woman's Christian Temperance Union
Mary Tenney Gray (1833–1904) – writer, clubwoman, philanthropist, suffragist
Helen Hoy Greeley (1878–1965) – Secretary, New Jersey Next Campaign (1915), stump speaker, organizer, and mobilizer in California and Oregon campaigns (1911), speaker for Women's Political Union in NYC
Jean Brooks Greenleaf (1832–1918) – president, New York State Suffrage Association (1890–96)
Cordelia A. Greene (1831–1905), physician; honorary president, Wyoming County, New York Suffrage Association
Irene W. Griffin (died 2012) – first black woman to register to vote in Plaquemines Parish, Louisiana
Josephine Sophia White Griffing (1814–1872) – active in the American Equal Rights Association and the National Woman Suffrage Association
Sarah Grimke (1792–1873) – abolitionist, writer
Sophronia Farrington Naylor Grubb (1834–1902), temperance activist; Kansas suffragist
Eliza Calvert Hall (pen name of Eliza Caroline "Lida" Calvert Obenchain) (1856–1935) – author, women's rights advocate
Ida Husted Harper (1851–1931) – organizer, major writer and historian of the US suffrage movement
Florence Jaffray Harriman (1870–1967) – social reformer, organiser and diplomat
Oreola Williams Haskell (1875–1953) – prolific author and poet, who worked alongside other notable suffrage activists, such as Carrie Chapman Catt, Mary Garrett Hay, and Ida Husted Harper
Mary Garrett Hay (1857–1928) – companion to Carrie Chapman Catt and suffrage organizer in New York
Gillette Hayden (1880–1929) – dentist and periodontist
Sallie Davis Hayden (1842–1907) – one of the founders of the suffrage movement in Arizona
Mary E. Smith Hayward (1842–1938) – businesswoman; honorary president of the Nebraska Equal Suffrage Association
Josephine K. Henry (1846–1928) – Progressive Era women's rights leader, social reformer and writer
Jane Lord Hersom (1840–1928) – physician; president, Portland, Maine Equal Suffrage Club
Katharine Houghton Hepburn (1878–1951) – social reformer, National Women's Party chairman in Connecticut. Graduate of Bryn Mawr College. Mother of Katharine Hepburn.
Elsie Hill (1883–1970) – activist
Helena Hill (1875–1958) – activist, geologist
Jennie Florella Holmes (1842–1892) — temperance activist; chair, executive committee, Nebraska State Suffrage Society
Mary Emma Holmes (1839–1937), reformer, educator; president, Equal Suffrage Association of Illinois
Edith Houghton Hooker (1879–1948) – activist, editor The Suffragist
Julia Ward Howe (1819–1910) – prominent abolitionist, social activist and poet
Emily Howland (1827–1929) – philanthropist, educator
Florence Frances Huberwald – singer, teacher, suffragist, national leader of the women's movement
Josephine Brawley Hughes (1839–1926) – established the Arizona Suffrage Association in 1891
Sarah Gibson Humphreys (1830–1907) – author, suffragist
Addie Waites Hunton (1866–1943) – suffragist, race and gender activist, writer, political organizer, educator
May Arkwright Hutton (1860–1915) – suffrage leader and labor rights advocate in the Pacific Northwest
Inez Haynes Irwin (1873–1970) – co-founder of the College Equal Suffrage League, active in National Woman's Party, wrote the party's history
Lucie Fulton Isaacs (1841–1916) — American writer, philanthropist; president of Walla Walla, Washington's suffrage association
Lottie Wilson Jackson (1854–1914) – painter and suffragist
Mary Corinna Putnam Jacobi (1842–1906) – medical physician, teacher, scientist, and writer
Ada James (1876–1952) – social worker and reformer 
Martha Waldron Janes (1832–1913) – minister, suffragist, columnist
Hester C. Jeffrey (1842–1934) – African American community organizer, creator of the Susan B. Anthony clubs 
Frances C. Jenkins (1826–1915) - evangelist, Quaker minister, social reformer; president, first equal suffrage organization in Kansas City, Missouri
Izetta Jewel (1883–1978) – stage actress, women's rights activist, politician and first woman to second the nomination of a presidential candidate at a major American political party convention
Laura M. Johns (1849–1935) – suffragist, journalist
Adelaide Johnson (1859–1955) – sculptor who created a monument for suffragists in Washington D.C.
Harriet C. Johnson (1845–1907) – suffragist, educator
Lucy Browne Johnston (1846–1937) –  president of the Kansas Federation of Women's Clubs, and was involved in the Kansas Equal Suffrage Association
Maria I. Johnston (1835–1921) — author, journalist, editor and lecturer from Virginia
Mary Johnston (1870 – 1936) - Viginia writer, author, and activist, spoke at the 1913 Woman Suffrage Procession
Effie McCollum Jones (1869–1952) – Universalist minister and suffragist
Jane Elizabeth Jones (1813–1896) – suffragist, abolitionist, member of the early women's rights movement 
Mary Jane Richardson Jones (1819–1909) – black suffragist, abolitionist, and philanthropist
Rosalie Gardiner Jones (1883–1978) – socialite, took part in Suffrage Hike, known as "General Jones"
Caroline Katzenstein (1888–1968) – suffragist and author from Philadelphia, helped form the National Woman's Party
Belle Kearney (1863–1939) – speaker and lobbyist for the National American Woman Suffrage Association; first woman elected to the Mississippi State Senate
Edna Buckman Kearns (1882–1934) – National Woman's Party campaigner, known for her horse-drawn suffrage campaign wagon (now in the collection of New York State Museum)
Mary Morton Kehew (1859–1918) – labor/social reformer and suffragist from Boston
Eliza D. Keith (1854–1939) – educator, writer, journalist; founding member/officer, Susan B. Anthony Club, San Francisco, California
Helen Keller (1880–1968) – author and political activist
Abby Kelley (1811–1887) – abolitionist, radical social reformer, fundraiser, lecturer and organizer for the American Anti-Slavery Society
Elizabeth Thacher Kent (1868–1952) – feminist, suffragist, environmentalist 
Harriette A. Keyser (1841–1936), industrial reformer, social worker, author; co-organizer, New York Woman Suffrage Association
Caroline Burnham Kilgore (1838–1909) – the first woman to be admitted to the bar in the Commonwealth of Pennsylvania
Janette Hill Knox (1845–1920) – vice-president of the Equal Suffrage Association of North Dakota; educator, temperance reformer
Sarah Knox-Goodrich (1826–1903) – women's rights activist from San Jose, California
Florence E. Kollock (1848–1925) – Universalist minister and lecturer
Daisy Elizabeth Adams Lampkin (1883–1965) – civil rights activist, organization executive, and community practitioner
Orra Henderson Moore Gray Langhorne (1841–1904) – suffragist, founder of Virginia Suffrage Society
Mary Torrans Lathrap (1838–1895) – poet, preacher, suffragist, social reformer
Clara Chan Lee (1886–1993) – first Chinese American to register to vote in the US, 8 November 1911 
Mabel Ping-Hua Lee (1896–1966) – suffragist, advocate for women's rights and for the Chinese immigrant community 
Dora Lewis (1862–1928) – in 1913 became an executive member of the National Women's Party; in 1918 became their chairwoman of finance; in 1919 became their national treasurer; in 1920 headed their ratification committee
Miriam Leslie (1836–1914) – publisher, author; namesake of the Leslie Woman Suffrage Commission
Lena Morrow Lewis (1868–1950) – organizer in South Dakota and Oregon; enlisted the support of labor unions
Mary Livermore (1820–1905) – journalist and advocate of women's rights
Sarah Hunt Lockrey (1863–1929) – physician and suffragist
Adella Hunt Logan (1863–1915) – African-American intellectual, activist and leading suffragist of the historically black Tuskegee University's Woman's Club
Florence Luscomb (1887–1985) – architect and prominent leader of Massachusetts suffragists
Katherine Duer Mackay (1878–1930) – founder of the Equal Franchise Society
 Theresa Malkiel (1874–1949) – labor organizer and suffragist
Arabella Mansfield (1846–1911) – first female lawyer in the United States, chaired the Iowa Women's Suffrage Convention in 1870, and worked with Susan B. Anthony
Ella M. S. Marble (1850–1929) – physician; president, Minnesota State Suffrage Association
Wenona Marlin – New York suffragist from Ohio
Anne Henrietta Martin (1875–1951) – Vice-chairman of National Woman's Party, arrested as a Silent Sentinel, president Nevada Equal Franchise Society, first US woman to run for Senate
Ellen A. Martin (1847–1916) – first woman to successful cast a vote in Illinois in 1891, under a loophole in the local law 
Jennie McCowen (1845–1924) – physician, writer, lecturer, medical journal editor, suffragist
Catharine Waugh McCulloch(1862–1945) – Chicago lawyer, active in the Illinois 1913 effort and legal adviser for the National American Woman Suffrage Association
Mary A. McCurdy (1852–1934) – African American suffragist
Mary Ann M'Clintock (1800–1884) – suffragist who helped plan the 1848 Seneca Falls Convention
Thomas M'Clintock (1792–1876) – abolitionist and suffragist, husband of Mary Ann M'Clintock
Nell Mercer (1893–1979) – member of the Silent Sentinels
Ellis Meredith (1865–1955) – journalist
Jane Hungerford Milbank (1871–1931) – author and poet
Inez Milholland (1886–1916) – key participant in the National Woman's Party and the 1913 Woman Suffrage Procession
Lucy Kennedy Miller, also known as Mrs. John O. Miller (1880–1962) – first president of the Pennsylvania League of Women Voters, and "the woman to whom, more than to any other" was "owe[d] the triumph of" women's suffrage in the Commonwealth of Pennsylvania.
Harriet May Mills (1857–1936) – prominent civil rights leader, played a major role in women's rights movement
Abby Crawford Milton (1881–1991) – traveled throughout Tennessee making speeches and organizing suffrage leagues in small communities; in 1920, she, along with Anne Dallas Dudley and Catherine Talty Kenny, led the campaign in Tennessee to approve ratification of the Nineteenth Amendment to the US Constitution 
Virginia Minor (1824–1894) – co-founder and president of the Woman's Suffrage Association of Missouri; unsuccessfully argued in Minor v. Happersett (1874 Supreme Court case) that the Fourteenth Amendment gave women the right to vote
Zeola Hershey Misener (1878–1966) – Indiana suffragist and politician
Lilla Day Monroe (1858–1929) – Kansas suffragist, lawyer
J. Howard Moore (1862–1916) – zoologist, philosopher, educator and socialist
Mary L. Moreland (1859–1918) – minister, evangelist, suffragist, author
Esther Hobart Morris (1814–1902) – first female Justice of the Peace in the United States
Mary Foulke Morrisson (1879–1971) – organizer of 1916 suffrage parade in Chicago at the Republican national Convention; founder of chapters of the League of Women Voters
Lucretia Mott (1793–1880) – Quaker, abolitionist; women's rights activist; social reformer
Martha H. Mowry (1818–1899) – Rhode Island physician and suffragist
Ella Uphay Mowry (1865–1923) – Kansas suffragist and the first female gubernatorial candidate in Kansas
Frances Lillian Willard "Fannie" Munds (1866–1948) – leader of the suffrage movement in Arizona and member of the Arizona Senate
John Neal (1793–1876) – writer, critic, first American women's rights lecturer
A. Viola Neblett (1842–1897) – activist, suffragist, women's rights pioneer
Anna E. Nicholes (1865–1917) – social reformer, civil servant, clubwoman; suffragist from Chicago
S. Grace Nicholes (1870–1922) - secretary, Illinois Equal Suffrage Association
Frances Nacke Noel (1873–1963) – women's labor activist and suffragist
Mary A. Nolan (died 1925) – one of the oldest suffragists active on NWP picket lines
Eunice Rockwood Oberly (1878–1921) – librarian
Adelina Otero-Warren (1881–1965) – Congressional Union leader in New Mexico, to be honored on a 2022 American Women quarter. 
Sarah Massey Overton (1850–1914) – women's rights activist and black rights activist
Fanny Purdy Palmer (1839–1923) – secretary, Rhode Island Woman Suffrage Association; author, lecturer, activist 
Maud Wood Park (1871–1955) – founder of the College Equal Suffrage League, co-founder of the Boston Equal Suffrage Association for Good Government (BESAGG); worked for passage of the 19th Amendment 
Alice Paul (1885–1977) – one of the leaders of the 1910s Women's Voting Rights Movement for the 19th Amendment; founder of the National Woman's Party; initiator of the Silent Sentinels and Woman Suffrage Parade of 1913; author of the proposed Equal Rights Amendment 
Mary Hutcheson Page (1860–1940) – Member of the Boston Equal Suffrage Association for Good Government, the National American Woman Suffrage Association, and the National Executive Committee of the Congressional Union for Women Suffrage. 1910 President of the National Woman Suffrage Association.
Millie Lawson Bethell Paxton (1875–1939) – civic leader and suffragist, organizer of the Colored Women's Republican Club of Roanoke, c. 1920
Mary Gray Peck (1867–1957) – journalist, suffragist, clubwoman
Sarah Maria Clinton Perkins (1824–1905) — minister, social reformer, editor, author; president, Equal Franchise Club, Cleveland, Ohio
Juno Frankie Pierce, also known as Frankie Pierce or J. Frankie Pierce (1864–1954) – African-American suffragist
Helen Pitts (1838–1903) – active in women's rights movement and co-edited The Alpha
Livia Simpson Poffenbarger (1862–1937) – state director for the women's suffrage campaign in West Virginia
Anita Pollitzer (1894–1975) – photographer, served as National Chairman in the National Woman's Party
Cora Scott Pond Pope (born 1856), Massachusetts suffragist; teacher, pageant writer, real estate developer
Alice Sampson Presto (1879–?), Washington state suffragist and politician
Amalia Post (1836–1897) – largely instrumental in having the franchise granted women in Wyoming Territory by the 1st Wyoming Territorial Legislature in 1869.
Marjorie Merriweather Post (1887–1973) – philanthropist, heiress to the Post Cereal company fortune
Jennie Phelps Purvis (1831–1924) – writer, temperance reformer; secretary of the California state suffrage association
Mamie Shields Pyle (1866–1949) – suffrage leader in South Dakota
Jeannette Rankin (1880–1973) – first U.S. female member of Congress (R) Montana. Rankin opened congressional debate on a Constitutional amendment granting universal suffrage to women, and voted for the resolution in 1919, which would become the 19th Amendment.
Florence Kenyon Hayden Rector (1882–1973) – first licensed female architect in the state of Ohio and the only female architect practicing in central Ohio between 1900 and 1930 
Harriet Redmond (c. 1862–1952) – Oregon suffragist
Rebecca Hourwich Reyher (1897–1987) – author and lecturer 
Naomi Sewell Richardson (1892–1993) - African-American suffragist and educator
Florida Ruffin Ridley (1861–1943) – African-American civil rights activist, suffragist, teacher, writer, and editor from Boston
Emma Winner Rogers (1855–1922) – treasurer, National American Woman Suffrage Association; also writer, speaker
Joy Young Rogers (1891–1953) – assistant editor of the Suffragist
Ellen Alida Rose (born 1843) – Wisconsin agriculturist, suffragist
Juliet Barrett Rublee (1875–1966) – birth control advocate, suffragist, and film producer
Josephine St. Pierre Ruffin (1842–1924) – African-American publisher, journalist, civil rights leader, suffragist, and editor
Ruth Logan Roberts (1891–1968) – suffragist, activist, YWCA leader, and host of a salon in Harlem 
Nina Samorodin (1892–1981) – Russian-born NWP member, executive secretary of National Labor Alliance for Trade Relations with and Recognition of Russia, secretary of Women's Trade-Union League
Margaret Sanger (1879–1966) – birth control activist, sex educator, nurse, established Planned Parenthood Federation of America 
Annie Nowlin Savery (1831–1891) – English-born Iowa suffragist active from the 1860s
Julia Sears (1840–1929) – pioneering academic and first woman in the US to head a public college, now Minnesota State University
Florida Scott-Maxwell (1883–1979) – author
May Wright Sewall (1844–1920) – chairperson of the National Woman's Suffrage Association's executive committee from 1882 to 1890 
Harriette Lucy Robinson Shattuck (1850–1937), president of the National Woman Suffrage Association of Massachusetts
Anna Howard Shaw (1847–1919) – president of National Women's Suffrage Association from 1904 to 1915 
Mary Shaw (1854–1929) – early feminist, playwright and actress
Pauline Agassiz Shaw (1841–1917) – co-founder and first president of the Boston Equal Suffrage Association for Good Government
Lurana W. Sheldon (1862–1945) – writer, editor, suffragist
Nettie Rogers Shuler (1862–1939) – writer, suffragist
Katherine Call Simonds (1865–1946) – musician, author, suffragist
Abby Hadassah Smith (1797–1879) – early American suffragist from Connecticut who campaigned for property and voting rights
Eliza Kennedy Smith, also known as Mrs. R. Templeton Smith (1889–1964) – suffragist, civic activist, and government watchdog in Pittsburgh, Pennsylvania, and president of the Allegheny County League of Women Voters 
Judith Winsor Smith (1821–1921) – president of the East Boston Woman Suffrage League
May Gorslin Preston Slosson (1858–1943) – educator and first woman to obtain a doctoral degree in Philosophy in the United States
The Smiths of Glastonbury – family of 6 women in Connecticut who were active in championing suffrage, property rights, and education for women
Louise Southgate, M.D. (1857–1941) – physician and suffragist in Covington, Kentucky, a leader in both the Ohio and the Kentucky Equal Rights Association and an early proponent for women's reproductive health
Caroline Spencer (1861–1928) – physician and suffragist; inducted into the Colorado Women's Hall of Fame in 2006.
Elizabeth Cady Stanton (1815–1902) – initiator of the Seneca Falls Convention, author of the Declaration of Sentiments, co-founder of National Women's Suffrage Association, major pioneer of women's rights in America
Helen Ekin Starrett (1840–1920) – author, journalist, educator, editor, business owner, lecturer, inventor, poet, pioneer suffragist, and one of the two state delegates from the 1869 National Convention to attend the Victory Convention in 1920
Sarah Burger Stearns (1836–1904) – first president of the Minnesota Woman Suffrage Association
Rowena Granice Steele (1824–1901) – advocate of woman suffrage, as a speaker and writer
Doris Stevens (1892–1963) – organizer for National American Women Suffrage Association and the National Woman's Party, prominent Silent Sentinels participant, author of Jailed for Freedom 
Sara Yorke Stevenson (1847–1921) – archaeologist and Egyptologist, active in the Philadelphia suffrage movement
Jane Agnes Stewart (1860–1944), author, editor; inventor of the first equal rights calendar
Lucy Stone (1818–1893) – prominent orator, abolitionist, and a vocal advocate and organizer for the rights for women; the main force behind the American Woman Suffrage Association and the Woman's Journal
Flora E. Strout (1867–1962) – Maryland delegate at American Woman Suffrage Association conventions
Adeline Morrison Swain (1820–1899) – first woman to run for public office in Iowa
Lucy Robbins Messer Switzer (1844–1922) – established the suffrage movement in eastern Washington
Beatrice Sumner Thompson (1874–1938) – African-American suffragist and education advocate 
Helen Taft (1891–1987) – daughter of President William Howard Taft; traveled the nation giving pro-suffrage speeches
Lydia Taft (1712–1778) – first woman known to legally vote in colonial America
Minnetta Theodora Taylor (1860–1911) – wrote the lyrics to the National Suffrage Anthem
Mary Church Terrell (1863–1954) – African-American educator, journalist, and co-founder of the National Association of Colored Women's League
Adolphine Fletcher Terry (1882–1976) – author, advocate for women's suffrage, education reform and social justice in Arkansas
Helen Rand Thayer (1863–1935) — member, Advisory Board of the New Hampshire Equal Suffrage Association
M. Carey Thomas (1857–1935) – educator, linguist, and second President of Bryn Mawr College
Grace Gallatin Seton Thompson (1872–1959) – author 
Dorothy Thompson (1893–1961) – Buffalo and New York activist, later journalist and radio broadcaster 
Ella St. Clair Thompson (1870–1944)
Minnie J. Terrell Todd (1844–1929) – Nebraska suffragist
Elizabeth Richards Tilton (1834–1897) – suffragist, founder of the Brooklyn Women's Club, poetry editor of The Revolution, hellish scandal
Annie Rensselaer Tinker (1884–1924) – suffragist, volunteer nurse in World War I, and philanthropist
Augusta Lewis Troup (1848–1920) – women's rights activist and journalist who advocated for equal pay, better working conditions for women, and women's right to vote
Grace Wilbur Trout (1864–1955) – President of the Illinois Illinois Equal Suffrage Association, spearheaded the 1913 effort granting Illinois women the right to vote
Sojourner Truth (–1883) – abolitionist, women's rights activist, speaker, gave women's rights speech "Ain't I a Woman?"
Harriet Tubman (1822–1913) – African-American abolitionist, humanitarian and Union spy during the American Civil War
Lila Meade Valentine (1865–1921) – education and health care reformer, women's rights activist, and the first president of the Equal Suffrage League of Virginia
Narcissa Cox Vanderlip, née Mabel Narcissa Cox (1879–1966) – leading New York suffragist and co-founder of the New York State League of Women Voters
Amelie Veiller Van Norman (1844–1920), educator; president, Joan of Arc Suffrage League; vice-president, New York County Suffrage League; member, Suffrage Party, New York City
Mina Van Winkle (1875–1932) – crusading social worker, groundbreaking police lieutenant and national leader in the protection of girls and other women during the law enforcement and judicial process
Mabel Vernon (1883–1975) – principal member of the Congressional Union for Women Suffrage, major organizer for the Silent Sentinels
Evelyn Wotherspoon Wainwright (1851–1929) –  founding member of the Congressional Union for Woman Suffrage and the National Woman's Party
Anna C. Wait (1837–1916) – Kansas Equal Suffrage Association
Sarah E. Wall (1825–1907) – organizer of an anti-tax protest that defended a woman's right not to pay taxation without representation 
Elizabeth Lowe Watson (1842–1927), president, California Equal Suffrage Association
Emmeline B. Wells (1828–1921) – journalist, editor, poet, women's rights advocate, and diarist
Ida B. Wells-Barnett (1862–1931) – journalist, educator, and early leader in the civil rights movement
Lilian Welsh (1858–1938) – physician, educator, and advocate for women's health
Ruza Wenclawska (1889–1977) – factory inspector and trade union organizer
Marion Craig Wentworth (1872–1942) – playwright
Nettie L. White (c. 1850–1921), president of the District of Columbia Woman Suffrage Association
Margaret Fay Whittemore (1884–1937) – vice-president of the National Woman's Party 1925
Emma Howard Wight (1863–1935) – Virginia suffragist; author
Mary Holloway Wilhite (1831–1892) – physician, philanthropist; woman's suffrage and women's rights leader
Frances Willard (1839–1898) – leader of the Women's Christian Temperance Union and International Council of Women, lecturer, writer 
Louise Collier Willcox (1865–1929) – honorary vice-president of the Virginia Equal Suffrage League
Maud E. Craig Sampson Williams (1880–1958) – suffragette from Texas; formed the El Paso Negro Woman's Civic and Equal Franchise League 
Ella B. Ensor Wilson (1838–1913), social reformer; Kansas suffragist
Alice Ames Winter (1865–1944) – litterateur, author, clubwoman, suffragist
Emma Wold (1871–1950) – president of the College Equal Suffrage Association in Oregon, later headquarters secretary of the National Woman's Party
Clara Snell Wolfe (1872–1970) – 1st Vice Chairman National Woman's Party and Chairman Ohio Branch
Victoria Woodhull (1838–1927) – women's rights activist, first woman to speak before a committee of Congress, first female candidate for President of the United States, one of the first women to start a weekly newspaper (Woodhull & Claflin's Weekly,) activist for labor reforms, advocate of free love

See also 
List of Alabama suffragists
List of Alaska suffragists
List of Arizona suffragists
List of Arkansas suffragists
List of California suffragists
List of Colorado suffragists
List of Delaware suffragists
List of Florida suffragists
List of Georgia (U.S. state) suffragists
List of Hawaii suffragists
List of Illinois suffragists
List of Iowa suffragists
List of Maine suffragists
List of Missouri suffragists
List of Montana suffragists
List of Nevada suffragists
List of New Jersey suffragists
List of New Mexico suffragists
List of North Dakota suffragists
List of Ohio suffragists
List of Pennsylvania suffragists
List of Rhode Island suffragists
List of South Dakota suffragists
List of Texas suffragists
List of Utah suffragists
List of Virginia suffragists
List of Wisconsin suffragists
List of Wyoming suffragists

United States Virgin Islands
Bertha C. Boschulte (1906–2004) – Secretary of the St. Thomas Teacher's Association, which sued for women's suffrage in the territory in 1935
Edith L. Williams (1887–1987) – first woman to attempt to register to vote in the US Virgin Islands

Uruguay
Paulina Luisi Janicki (1875–1949) – leader of the feminist movement in Uruguay, first Uruguayan woman to earn a medical degree in Uruguay (1909)

Venezuela
 Carmen Clemente Travieso (1900–1983) – journalist and women's rights activist

Yishuv
Rosa Welt-Straus (1856–1938) – suffragist and feminist

Major suffrage organizations
 Alpha Suffrage Club – believed to be the first black women's suffrage association in the United States; began in Chicago, Illinois, in 1913 under the initiative of Ida B. Wells-Barnett and Belle Squire
 American Equal Rights Association – from 1866 to 1869, early attempt at a national organization by Lucy Stone, Susan B. Anthony and others
 American Woman Suffrage Association – American suffrage organization formed in 1869 by Lucy Stone and Antoinette Brown Blackwell after a split in the American Equal Rights Association; it joined NAWSA in 1890
 Asociación Nacional de Mujeres Españolas  –  Spanish organization from 1918 to 1936
 Associazione per la donna – early Italian organization founded in 1896 with an emphasis on defending women's rights
 Boston Equal Suffrage Association for Good Government – American organization devoted to women's suffrage in Massachusetts; active from 1901 to 1920
 Bulgarskiat Zhenski Suyut –  Bulgarian organization from 1901 to 1944
 Canadian Women's Suffrage Association – founded in 1877, name changed in 1883 to Toronto Women's Suffrage Association
 College Equal Suffrage League – U.S. group founded in 1900 by Maud Wood Park and Inez Haynes Irwin to attract younger women to the movement; merged with the National American Woman Suffrage Association in 1908
 Congressional Union – radical U.S. organization formed in 1913 to campaign for a constitutional amendment for women's voting rights; led by Alice Paul and Lucy Burns; in 1915 changed its name to National Woman's Party
 Danske Kvindeforeningers Valgretsforbund (Danish Women's Society's Suffrage Union) – founded in 1898
 Dublin Women's Suffrage Association – major Irish organization
 Equal Franchise Society – created and joined by American women of wealth, a politically active organization conducted within a socially comfortable milieu
 Federação Brasileira pelo Progresso Feminino – Brazilian organisation from 1922
 French Union for Women's Suffrage – founded in 1909 to promote women's suffrage
 Fusen Kakutoku Domei – Japanese organisation from 1923
 Greek League for Women's Rights – founded 1920 to promote women's political rights and suffrage
 Indiana Woman's Suffrage Association – founded in 1852 to help women gain the right to vote
 International Alliance of Women – founded in 1904 to promote women's suffrage
 Irish Women's Franchise League – founded in 1908, more radical than the Dublin Association
 Irish Women's Suffrage Society – founded by Isabella Tod as the North of Ireland Women's Suffrage Society in 1872; it was based in Belfast but had branches in other parts of the north
 Kvindevalgretsforeningen (Women's Suffrage Association) – Danish women's organization (1889–1898) specifically focused on suffrage
 Kvindelig Fremskridtsforening (Women's Progress Association) – Danish organization (1885–1893) with a focus on women's voting rights
 Landsforbundet for Kvinders Valgret – Danish organization
 Leslie Woman Suffrage Commission – formed by Carrie Chapman Catt in March 1917 using funds willed for the purpose by Miriam Leslie. The commission, based in New York City, promoted woman's suffrage by educating the public and was affiliated with the National American Woman Suffrage Association (NAWSA).
 Ligue belge du droit des femmes – Belgian organization founded in 1892 in support of women's rights
 Naisasialiitto Unioni – founded 1892, Finnish arm of the International Alliance of Women
 National American Woman Suffrage Association (NAWSA) – formed in 1890 by the joining of the American Woman Suffrage Association and the National Woman Suffrage Association
 National Association for Women's Suffrage (Norway) – Norwegian organization from 1898 to 1913
 National Association for Women's Suffrage (Sweden) – Swedish organization from 1902 to 1921
 National Society for Women's Suffrage – Britain's first large suffrage organization, founded in 1867 by Lydia Becker
 National Union of Women's Suffrage Societies – major United Kingdom organization
 National Woman's Party – major United States organization founded in 1915 by Alice Paul and Lucy Burns to campaign for a constitutional amendment; organized the Silent Sentinels; from 1913 to 1915 the same core group's name was the Congressional Union
 National Women's Rights Convention – series of major US organizing conventions, held from 1850 to 1869
 National Woman Suffrage Association – American organization founded in 1869 by Susan B. Anthony and Elizabeth Cady Stanton after the split in the American Equal Rights Association; joined NAWSA in 1890
 New England Woman Suffrage Association (NEWSA) – formed in 1868 as the first major political organization with women's suffrage as its goal, active until 1920, principal leaders were Julia Ward Howe and Lucy Stone, played key role in forming the American Woman Suffrage Association
 Nüzi canzheng tongmenghui – Chinese organisation from 1912
 Silent Sentinels – Members of the National Woman's Party who picketed America's White House from January 1917 to June 1919 during Woodrow Wilson's presidency and until the 19th Amendment was passed; initiated and led by Alice Paul
 Türk Kadinlar Birligi – main suffrage organization in Turkey, founded 1924
 Union des femmes de Wallonie – Belgian organization founded in 1912 for women in the French-speaking province of Wallonia
 Vereeniging voor Vrouwenkiesrecht – Dutch organization from 1894 to 1919
 Woman's Christian Temperance Union – active in the suffrage movement, especially in the US and created the World WCTU which sent missionaries around the world, including to New Zealand
 Women's Christian Temperance Union of New Zealand – led the petition campaign that successfully led in 1893 to the first self-governing nation to grant woman suffrage
 Women's Franchise League – major British group created in 1889 by Emmeline Pankhurst
 Women's Freedom League – British group founded in 1907 by 70 members of the Women's Social and Political Union in a breakaway following rules changes by Christabel Pankhurst
 Women's Social and Political Union – major suffrage organization in United Kingdom (breakaway from the National Union for Women's Suffrage)
 Women's Trade Union League – American organization formed in 1903, later involved with the campaign for the 19th amendment

Women's suffrage publications

Nineteenth Amendment to the United States Constitution – drafted by Susan B. Anthony and Elizabeth Cady Stanton in 1878, ratified in 1920
Declaration of Sentiments – major statement for women's rights, including the right to vote, passed and signed at the Seneca Falls Convention in 1848; mainly written by Elizabeth Cady Stanton
History of Woman Suffrage – six books produced from 1881 to 1922 by Elizabeth Cady Stanton, Susan B. Anthony, Matilda Joslyn Gage and Ida Husted Harper
Jus Suffragii – official journal of the International Woman Suffrage Alliance, published monthly from 1906 to 1924
Suffrage Atelier – publishing collective in England, founded in 1909
The Freewoman – feminist weekly which, among other topics, covered the suffrage movement; published between November 1911 and October 1912 and edited by Dora Marsden and Mary Gawthorpe
The Liberator – weekly newspaper published by William Lloyd Garrison which, although primarily supporting abolition of slavery, also took up the suffrage cause from 1838 until it closed in 1865
The Revolution – weekly US newspaper, 1868–1872; official publication of the National Woman Suffrage Association
The Suffragist – 1913–1920 newspaper of the Congressional Union for Woman Suffrage
Suffragette Sally – 1911 suffrage novel by Gertrude Colmore
The Vote – publication of British Women's Freedom League
The Una – 1853 paper devoted to the enfranchisement of woman, owned and edited by Paulina Wright Davis, and first published in Providence, Rhode Island. The Una was the first paper focused on woman suffrage, and the first distinctively woman's rights journal. 
Votes for Women – 1907–1918 newspaper, the official paper of the Women's Social and Political Union, United Kingdom
Woman's Journal and Suffrage News – major weekly newspaper founded by Lucy Stone and Henry Blackwell in 1870, eventually absorbed other suffrage publications
Women's Suffrage Journal – magazine published 1870–1890 in the United Kingdom
The Woman's Tribune – newspaper published from 1883 to 1909 by Clara Bewick Colby

See also
 Anti-suffragists
 List of civil rights leaders
 List of democracy and elections-related topics
 List of feminists
 List of monuments and memorials to women's suffrage
 List of women's rights activists
 Open Christmas Letter
 Seneca Falls Convention
 Suffrage Hikes
 Timeline of first women's suffrage in majority-Muslim countries
 Timeline of women's rights (other than voting)
 Timeline of women's suffrage
 Women's suffrage in Australia
 Women's suffrage in Japan
 Women's suffrage in New Zealand
 Women's suffrage in the United Kingdom
 Women's suffrage in Scotland
 Women's suffrage in the United States
 List of California suffragists
 List of Texas suffragists
 Timeline of women's suffrage in California
 Timeline of women's suffrage in New Mexico
 Timeline of women's suffrage in Texas

References

Bibliography

+
Suffragists and suffragettes

Suffragists and suffragettes
Suffragists and suffragettes
Suffragists and suffragettes